= Master in the House =

South Korean television program

- Promotional poster of season 2
- Also known as: All the Butlers
- Genre: Reality; Variety
- Starring: See below
- Country of origin: South Korea
- Original language: Korean
- No. of seasons: 2
- No. of episodes: 254

Production
- Production locations: South Korea, Vietnam, United States, Japan, New Zealand
- Running time: 75–90 minutes

Original release
- Network: SBS
- Release: December 31, 2017 – April 23, 2023

Master in the House (Korean: 집사부일체; pronounced [tɕips͈abu.iɭtɕʰe]; abbreviated as Jipsabu) is a South Korean television program that aired on SBS weekly on Sundays at 18:25 (KST) from December 31, 2017, until the conclusion of Season 1 on September 18, 2022, when the show went on hiatus.

Season 2 began from January 1, 2023, on Sundays at 17:00 (KST), and ended on April 23 the same year.

== Overview ==
The cast members spend two days and one night together with reputable figures of various fields or professions, known as Masters (사부), and get to know about the lives of the Masters, in the hopes of gaining knowledge and wisdom. There are also 1-day Masters in the show, which the cast would instead spend a day together with.

== Cast ==
=== Cast members ===
Name	Episodes	Ref.
Lee Sang-yoon	1–111	
Yook Sung-jae (BtoB)	1–111	
Lee Seung-gi	1–238	
Yang Se-hyung	1–254	
Shin Sung-rok	102–177	
Kim Dong-hyun	114–254	
Cha Eun-woo (Astro)	116–177	
Yoo Su-bin	180–215	
Eun Ji-won (Sechs Kies)	216–254	
Doyoung (NCT)	227–254	
Lee Dae-ho	239–254	
BamBam (Got7)	239–254	

=== 1-day Disciples ===
Name(s)	Episode(s)
Lee Hong-gi (F.T. Island), Yoon Bo-ra, Crush	62
Shin Sung-rok	85–86
Ong Seong-wu	112–113
Kim Dong-hyun	114–117
Lee Jin-hyuk (UP10TION)	114–115
Cha Eun-woo (Astro)	116–117
Park Goon	178–179
Jeon Seok-ho	185–186
Gree	193
Hwang Je-sung	197, 199
Yook Sung-jae (BtoB)	200–201
Eun Ji-won	205, 210
Hyojung (Oh My Girl)	207–208, 223–224
Leejung Lee	209–215
Joohoney (Monsta X)	216
Kim Min-kyu	217–218
Doyoung (NCT)	219–222
Kang Seung-yoon (Winner)	225–226
Mimi (Oh My Girl)	250–251
Lee Sang-yoon	252–253
Lee Hye-sung	252–253

=== Changes to the cast ===
On December 29, 2019, it was announced that Shin Sung-rok would join the show as part of the fixed cast, beginning from the episode aired on January 12, 2020. This marked Shin's first fixed variety show of his career.

Original cast members Lee Sang-yoon and Yook Sung-jae left the show on February 11, 2020, during episode 111 and were replaced by Kim Dong-hyun and Cha Eun-woo beginning on episode 116. Both Shin and Cha departed the show on June 20, 2021, with episode 177 being their last as regular cast members.

Yoo Su-bin then joined as a fixed cast member on episode 180, followed by Eun Ji-won from episode 216. Yoo left the show on April 10, 2022, with episode 215 being his last.

It was announced on June 24, 2022, that NCT member Doyoung has joined the show as a fixed cast member, with his first episode airing on July 3, 2022.

On December 21, 2022, it was confirmed that retired baseball player Lee Dae-ho and Got7 member BamBam would join the show as fixed cast members, while original member Lee Seung-gi would not be joining for Season 2.

== Episodes (2017–2018) ==
List of episodes in 2017-2018 (episode 1–50)

Ep.	Broadcast Date	Master #	Master(s) (Occupation(s))	Note(s)
1	December 31, 2017	1	Jeon In-kwon (Singer-songwriter)	Introduction of the cast; Phone Call Hint Fairy: Cho Jae-hyun; Special voice appearance by Twice through phone
2	January 7, 2018	1	Jeon In-kwon (Singer-songwriter)	—
3	January 14	1	Jeon In-kwon (Singer-songwriter)	—
4	January 21	2	Lee Dae-ho (Professional baseball player)	—
5	January 28	2	Lee Dae-ho (Professional baseball player)	—
6	February 4	3	Choi Bool-am (Actor)	Phone Call Hint Fairy: Taeyang (Big Bang)
7	February 11	3	Choi Bool-am (Actor)	—
—	No broadcast on February 18 due to the live coverage of the 2018 Winter Olympics			
8	February 25	4	Youn Yuh-jung (Actress)	The broadcast time for this episode was shifted to 16:50 (KST) instead of the usual 18:20 due to the broadcasting of the 2018 Winter Olympics closing ceremony.
9	March 4	4	Youn Yuh-jung (Actress)	—
10	March 11	5	Lee Seung-hoon (Speed skater)	—
11	March 18	5	Lee Seung-hoon (Speed skater)	Special narration appearance by Bae Sung-jae
12	March 25	6	BoA (Singer)	Phone Call Hint Fairy: Yoo Hae-jin; Special appearance by NCT
13	April 1	6	BoA (Singer)	—
14	April 8	7	Park Hang-seo (Current coach of the Vietnam national football team)	The cast head to Hanoi, Vietnam for filming
15	April 15	7	Park Hang-seo (Current coach of the Vietnam national football team)	The cast head to Hanoi, Vietnam for filming
16	April 22	7	Park Hang-seo (Current coach of the Vietnam national football team)	The cast head to Hanoi, Vietnam for filming
16	April 22	8	Cha In-pyo (Actor, director)	—
17	April 29	8	Cha In-pyo (Actor, director)	—
18	May 6	8	Cha In-pyo (Actor, director)	Special voice appearance by Shin Ae-ra through phone
19	May 13	9	Pomnyun (Buddhist monk, Zen master, activist)	Phone Call Hint Fairy: Han Ji-min
20	May 20	9	Pomnyun (Buddhist monk, Zen master, activist)	—
21	May 27	10	Lee Sun-hee (Singer)	Hint Fairy: Jeon In-kwon
22	June 3	10	Lee Sun-hee (Singer)	Special appearance by Lee Geum-hee
23	June 10	11	Park Ji-sung (Retired professional football player)	Phone Call Hint Fairy: Yoo Jae-suk; Special voice appearance by Kim Min-ji through phone
24	June 17	11	Park Ji-sung (Retired professional football player)	Special appearance by Bae Sung-jae
25	June 24	12	Go Doo-shim (Actress)	Phone Call Hint Fairy: Lee Sun-kyun; Special appearance by Hong Seok-cheon
26	July 1	12	Go Doo-shim (Actress)	—
27	July 8	13	Seol Min-seok (History lecturer)	Phone Call Hint Fairy: Kim Sang-joong
28	July 15	13	Seol Min-seok (History lecturer)	—
29	July 22	14	Lee Deok-hwa (Actor)	Phone Call Hint Fairy: Kim Hee-ae
30	July 29	14	Lee Deok-hwa (Actor)	—
31	August 5	15	Yoo Jun-sang (Actor, singer)	Phone Call Hint Fairy: Suzy; Special appearances by Seo Eun-kwang (BtoB), Nam Woo-hyun (Infinite) and Hong Eun-hee
32	August 12	15	Yoo Jun-sang (Actor, singer)	Special appearances by Kim Beop-rae, Min Young-gi and Um Ki-joon
—	No broadcast on August 19 due to the live coverage of the 2018 Asian Games			
33	August 26	16	Kang San-ae (Folk rock singer-songwriter)	Special appearance by Chang Kiha (also the Hint Fairy)
34	September 2	16	Kang San-ae (Folk rock singer-songwriter)	Special appearance by Chang Kiha (also the Hint Fairy)
35	September 9	17	Shin Ae-ra (Actress)	Special appearance by Cha In-pyo (also the Hint Fairy and the Inviter); Special appearance by Ki Hong Lee in episode 36; The cast head to Los Angeles, United States for filming
36	September 16	17	Shin Ae-ra (Actress)	Special appearance by Cha In-pyo (also the Hint Fairy and the Inviter); Special appearance by Ki Hong Lee in episode 36; The cast head to Los Angeles, United States for filming
37	September 23	17	Shin Ae-ra (Actress)	Special appearance by Cha In-pyo (also the Hint Fairy and the Inviter); Special appearance by Ki Hong Lee in episode 36; The cast head to Los Angeles, United States for filming
38	September 30	17	Shin Ae-ra (Actress)	Special appearance by Cha In-pyo (also the Hint Fairy and the Inviter); Special appearance by Ki Hong Lee in episode 36; The cast head to Los Angeles, United States for filming
39	October 7	18	Kim Byung-man (Comedian)	Phone Call Hint Fairy: Lee Soo-geun
40	October 14	18	Kim Byung-man (Comedian)	—
41	October 21	19	Lee Moon-sae (Singer)	Phone Call Hint Fairy: Noh Sa-yeon
42	October 28	19	Lee Moon-sae (Singer)	—
—	No broadcast on November 4 due to the live coverage of the KBO League match			
43	November 11	20	Noh Hee-young (Brand strategist, CEO of YG Foods)	Phone Call Hint Fairy: Ha Jung-woo; First 1-day Master of the series
44	November 18	21	Kim Soo-mi (Actress)	Phone Call Hint Fairy: Shin Dong-yup
45	November 25	21	Kim Soo-mi (Actress)	Special voice appearance by Yang Se-chan through phone
46	December 2	22	Son Ye-jin (Actress) (Note: Appeared as the "MT Planner")	Phone Call Hint Fairy: Gong Hyo-jin
47	December 9	22	Son Ye-jin (Actress)	—
48	December 16	23	Lee Soon-jae (Actor)	Phone Call Hint Fairy: Lee Seo-jin
49	December 23	23	Lee Soon-jae (Actor)	—
50	December 30	24	Yoo Min-sang, Kim Jun-hyun, Kim Min-kyung, Moon Se-yoon (Comedians)	Year End Special

== Episodes (2019) ==
List of episodes in 2019 (episode 51–100)

Ep.	Broadcast Date	Master #	Master(s) (Occupation(s))	Note(s)
51	January 6	25	Sean (Jinusean member, rapper)	Special appearance by Jung Hye-young; Special video appearances by Yoo Byung-jae, Hwang Kwang-hee (ZE:A), Ham Chun-ho and Wanna One (Ong Seong-wu, Kim Jae-hwan)
52	January 13	26	Choi Min-soo (Actor)	Phone Call Hint Fairy: Kang Ho-dong
53	January 20	26	Choi Min-soo (Actor)	Special appearance by June Kang
54	January 27	27	Lee Yeon-bok (Chef)	Phone Call Hint Fairy: Heechul (Super Junior); Special voice appearances by Lee Sun-hee, Park Ji-sung, Jeon In-kwon, Kim Soo-mi, Kang San-ae, Lee Deok-hwa and Lee Dae-ho through phone; Special appearances by Kim Soo-mi and Jeon In-kwon
55	February 3	27	Lee Yeon-bok (Chef)	Special appearances by Kim Soo-mi, Jeon In-kwon, Kang San-ae, Kim Poong, Zhang Yu'an and Wang Yuk-sung
56	February 10	28	Lee Sang-hwa (Speed skater)	Phone Call Hint Fairy: Hong Jin-young
57	February 17	28	Lee Sang-hwa (Speed skater)	—
58	February 24	29	Yoo Se-yoon (Comedian, host, UV member, writer, music video director, CEO of an advertisement company)	Phone Call Hint Fairy: You Hee-yeol; Special appearance by Muzie
59	March 3	29	Yoo Se-yoon (Comedian, host, UV member, writer, music video director, CEO of an advertisement company)	Special appearance by Muzie
60	March 10	30	Park Jin-young (Singer-songwriter, record producer, CEO of JYP Entertainment)	Phone Call Hint Fairy: Rain; Special appearance by ITZY
61	March 17	30	Park Jin-young (Singer-songwriter, record producer, CEO of JYP Entertainment)	Special appearance by ITZY
62	March 24	31	Kang Hyung-wook (Entrepreneur, companion dog trainer)	—
63	March 31	31	Kang Hyung-wook (Entrepreneur, companion dog trainer)	—
64	April 7	32	Yang Hee-eun (Singer)	Phone Call Hint Fairy: Kim Sook
65	April 14	32	Yang Hee-eun (Singer)	Special appearance by Yang Hee-kyung; The show had a live stream through Naver V Live on March 26, 2019, and had Sejeong (Gugudan) as guest
66	April 21	33	Jeon Yu-seong (Comedian)	Phone Call Hint Fairy: Lee Young-ja; Special voice appearance by Jo Se-ho through phone
67	April 28	33	Jeon Yu-seong (Comedian)	Special appearances by Lee Bong-won and Kim Soo-yong
68	May 5	34	Bae Mong-gi, Hong Beom-seok, Cho Myung-soo, Lee Jin-hee (Firefighters) (Note: The 34th Masters are all the firefighters in South Korea, and these 4 firefighters appeared as representatives of the Masters)	International Firefighters' Day Special
69	May 12	34	Bae Mong-gi, Hong Beom-seok, Cho Myung-soo, Lee Jin-hee (Firefighters)	International Firefighters' Day Special
70	May 19	35	Jung Doo-hong (Action director, stunt coordinator, actor)	Phone Call Hint Fairy: Lee Byung-hun
71	May 26	35	Jung Doo-hong (Action director, stunt coordinator, actor)	—
72	June 2	36	Lee Seo-jin (Actor) (Note: Appeared as the "Travelling Companion")	Enlightenment Vacation Special; The cast head to Aomori, Japan for filming
73	June 9	36	Lee Seo-jin (Actor)	Enlightenment Vacation Special; The cast head to Aomori, Japan for filming
74	June 16	37	John Alderman Linton (President of the Korea Foundation for International Healthcare, professor at Yonsei University College of Medicine)	Video Hint Fairy: Lee Guk-jong
75	June 23	37	John Alderman Linton (President of the Korea Foundation for International Healthcare, professor at Yonsei University College of Medicine)	—
75	June 23	38	Bernard Werber (Writer)	Special appearance by Robin Deiana; No broadcast on June 30 due to the live coverage of the 2019 North Korea–United States DMZ Summit
76	July 7	38	Bernard Werber (Writer)	Special appearance by Robin Deiana; No broadcast on June 30 due to the live coverage of the 2019 North Korea–United States DMZ Summit
77	July 14	39	Jang Yoon-jeong (Trot singer)	Phone Call Hint Fairy: Son Hyun-joo
78	July 21	39	Jang Yoon-jeong (Trot singer)	Special appearances by So Yu-mi, Namoo, Young Tak, YunHee and Kim Bbak Gu
79	July 28	40	Chung Jung-yong (Soccer coach and former soccer player)	Special appearances by Hwang Tae-hyeon, Oh Se-hun and Um Won-sang
80	August 4	41	Choi Soo-jong (Actor)	Special voice appearances by Jo Dal-hwan, Lee Hong-gi (F.T. Island) and Peniel (BtoB) through phone; Special appearance by Lee Deok-hwa
81	August 11	41	Choi Soo-jong (Actor)	Special appearance by Lee Deok-hwa
82	August 18	42	Hur Jae (Basketball coach)	—
83	August 25	43	Noh Sa-yeon, Lee Moo-song (Singers)	—
84	September 1	43	Noh Sa-yeon, Lee Moo-song (Singers)	Special appearances by Noh Sa-bong (Note: Noh Sa-yeon's elder sister) and Han Sang-jin
85	September 8	44	Park Ji-woo, J Black (Dancers)	Special appearance by Cho Jung-sik in episode 85
86	September 15	44	Park Ji-woo, J Black (Dancers)	Special appearance by Cho Jung-sik in episode 85
87	September 22	45	Shin Seung-hwan, Jang Na-ra, Yoo Byung-jae, Peniel (BtoB) (Celebrities) (Note: Appeared as the Friends of the cast members)	My Master Is A Friend Special
88	September 29	45	Shin Seung-hwan, Jang Na-ra, Yoo Byung-jae, Peniel (BtoB) (Celebrities)	My Master Is A Friend Special
89	October 6	46	Jung Chan-sung (Mixed martial artist, kickboxer)	Special appearance by Julien Kang
90	October 13	46	Jung Chan-sung (Mixed martial artist, kickboxer)	Special appearance by Julien Kang
91	October 20	47	Park Chan-ho (Retired professional baseball player)	—
92	October 27	47	Park Chan-ho (Retired professional baseball player)	Special voice appearance by Pak Se-ri through phone; Special appearance by Lee Seung-yuop
93	November 3	48	Kim Gun-mo (Singer-songwriter)	Phone Call Hint Fairy: Kim Jong-min (Koyote)
94	November 10	48	Kim Gun-mo (Singer-songwriter)	—
—	No broadcast on November 17 due to the live coverage of the 2019 WBSC Premier12 finals between South Korea and Japan			
95	November 24	49	Lee Young-ae (Actress)	Video Hint Fairy: Park Chan-wook
96	December 1	49	Lee Young-ae (Actress)	Special voice appearances by Park Na-rae, Suzy and Jang Seo-hee through phone
97	December 8	50	Kim Byung-man (Comedian)	The cast head to New Zealand for filming; Kim Byung-man is the first to appear as a Master twice
98	December 15	50	Kim Byung-man (Comedian)	The cast head to New Zealand for filming; Kim Byung-man is the first to appear as a Master twice
99	December 22	50	Kim Byung-man (Comedian)	The cast head to New Zealand for filming; Kim Byung-man is the first to appear as a Master twice
100	December 29	51	Jang Joon-hwan, Moon So-ri (Film director), (Actress, screenwriter, director)	100th Episode special; Phone Call Hint Fairy: Gang Dong-won

== Episodes (2020) ==
List of episodes in 2020 (episode 101–152)

Ep.	Broadcast Date	Master #	Master(s) (Occupation(s))	Note(s)
101	January 5	51	Jang Joon-hwan, Moon So-ri (Film director), (Actress, screenwriter, director)	—
102	January 12	52	Jang Jin-woo (Coach of the South Korea National Representative Cheerleading Team)	Shin Sung-rok joined the show as a permanent cast member
103	January 19	52	Jang Jin-woo (Coach of the South Korea National Representative Cheerleading Team)	Special appearance by Shin Soo-ji
104	January 26	53	Pak Se-ri, Choi Byung-chul, Kim Dong-hyun, Cho Jun-ho, Kwak Yoon-gy (Athletes)	—
105	February 2	53	Pak Se-ri, Choi Byung-chul, Kim Dong-hyun, Cho Jun-ho, Kwak Yoon-gy (Athletes)	Special appearance by Cho Jung-sik
106	February 9	54	Kim Nam-gil (Actor)	Phone Call Hint Fairy: Jeon Do-yeon
107	February 16	54	Kim Nam-gil (Actor)	—
108	February 23	55	Park Hyun-bin, Hong Jin-young (Trot singers)	—
109	March 1	55	Park Hyun-bin, Hong Jin-young (Trot singers)	Special appearances by Ha Chun-hwa, Hyun Sook and Jin Sung
110	March 8	56	Lee Se-dol (Retired professional Go player)	Special appearance by Oh My Girl through video call
111	March 15	56	Lee Se-dol (Retired professional Go player)	Lee Sang-yoon and Yook Sung-jae's final episode before graduating from the show; Special appearances via video by Park Ji-sung, Kim Byung-man, Jang Yoon-jeong and Shin Ae-ra
112	March 22	57	Kim Deok-soo (Samul nori musician)	Special appearances by Daniel Lindemann and Sam Okyere on episode 113
113	March 29	57	Kim Deok-soo (Samul nori musician)	Special appearances by Daniel Lindemann and Sam Okyere on episode 113
114	April 5	58	Sean Lee, Park Kyung-hwa, Lim Ji-ho (Body builder, sports trainer), (CEO of Korea Art Psychology Counselling Association), (Chef)	Health Special Training Special
115	April 12	58	Sean Lee, Park Kyung-hwa, Lim Ji-ho (Body builder, sports trainer), (CEO of Korea Art Psychology Counselling Association), (Chef)	Health Special Training Special
116	April 19	59	Production crew of Unanswered Questions, anchors of SBS 8 News, PDs of SBS variety shows	SBS Internship Interview Special; Special appearances: Episode 116: Lee Soo-jung, Cho Jung-sik, Kim Hyun-woo, Choi Hye-rim, Kim Yoon-sang; Episode 117: Kim Hyun-woo, Choi Hye-rim, Kim Yoon-sang, Cho Jung-sik, Choi Young-in, Park Sung-hoon, Kwak Seung-young; Special voice appearances by Han Ji-min, You Hee-yeol, Baek Jong-won and Ma Dong-seok through phone on episode 117
117	April 26	59	Production crew of Unanswered Questions, anchors of SBS 8 News, PDs of SBS variety shows	SBS Internship Interview Special; Special appearances: Episode 116: Lee Soo-jung, Cho Jung-sik, Kim Hyun-woo, Choi Hye-rim, Kim Yoon-sang; Episode 117: Kim Hyun-woo, Choi Hye-rim, Kim Yoon-sang, Cho Jung-sik, Choi Young-in, Park Sung-hoon, Kwak Seung-young; Special voice appearances by Han Ji-min, You Hee-yeol, Baek Jong-won and Ma Dong-seok through phone on episode 117
118	May 3	60	Jin Jong-oh, Lee Dae-hoon, Yang Hak-seon (Athletes)	Kim Dong-hyun and Cha Eun-woo (Astro) joined the show as permanent cast members; Special appearances by Seo Go-eun, (Note: Rhythmic gymnast) Pak Se-ri, Choi Byung-chul and Cho Jun-ho on episode 119
119	May 10	60	Jin Jong-oh, Lee Dae-hoon, Yang Hak-seon (Athletes)	Kim Dong-hyun and Cha Eun-woo (Astro) joined the show as permanent cast members; Special appearances by Seo Go-eun, Pak Se-ri, Choi Byung-chul and Cho Jun-ho on episode 119
120	May 17	61	Shin Seung-hun (Singer-songwriter)	—
121	May 24	61	Shin Seung-hun (Singer-songwriter)	Special appearances by Seo Young-do, Gil Eun-kyung and Rothy
122	May 31	62	Kim Yeon-koung (Professional volleyball player)	—
123	June 7	62	Kim Yeon-koung (Professional volleyball player)	Special appearances by Kim Su-ji, Yang Hyo-jin, Kim Hee-jin and Ko Ye-rim
124	June 14	63	Uhm Jung-hwa (Singer, actress)	Video Call Hint Fairy: Lee Sang-yoon
125	June 21	63	Uhm Jung-hwa (Singer, actress)	Special appearances by Hong Jin-kyung, Ha Do-kwon, Lee Jae-yoon, Lee Jin-ho, Eunhyuk (Super Junior) and MJ (Astro)
126	June 28	64	Namgoong Hoon (CEO of Kakao Games)	—
127	July 5	65	John Lee (CEO of Meritz Asset Management)	Special appearance by Hyun Young, Shin Seung-hwan, Im Do-hyung, Kim Seol and Oh A-rin
128	July 12	66	Lee Jung-hyun (Singer, actress)	Phone Call Hint Fairy: Park Chan-wook
129	July 19	66	Lee Jung-hyun (Singer, actress)	Special appearance by Koo Jun-yup (Clon)
130	July 26	67	Jang Do-yeon, Park Na-rae (Comedians)	—
131	August 2	67	Jang Do-yeon, Park Na-rae (Comedians)	—
132	August 9	68	Yoshihiro Akiyama / Choo Sung-hoon (Mixed martial artist)	—
133	August 16	69	Choi Hyun-mi (Professional boxer)	—
134	August 23	70	Kim Hee-sun (Actress)	—
135	August 30	70	Kim Hee-sun (Actress)	—
136	September 6	71	Park In-cheol (Entrepreneur, CEO of PowerfulX)	—
137	September 13	72	Ken Rhee (Discharged Republic of Korea Navy Special Warfare Flotilla Lieutenant, YouTuber)	Special appearance by Lee Dong-gook via video call
138	September 20	72	Ken Rhee (Discharged Republic of Korea Navy Special Warfare Flotilla Lieutenant, YouTuber)	—
139	September 27	73	Tyler Rasch, Seol Min-seok (Note: Previously appeared as a master in episodes 27-28) (Broadcast personality), (History lecturer)	Family Visit Special
140	October 4	74	Im Chang-jung (Singer-songwriter, actor)	—
141	October 11	74	Im Chang-jung (Singer-songwriter, actor)	Special appearance by Huh Gak
142	October 18	75	Bae Seong-woo (Actor)	Special appearance by Cha Tae-hyun (also the Phone Call Hint Fairy); Special appearance by Bae Sung-jae through video call on episode 142
143	October 25	75	Bae Seong-woo (Actor)	Special appearance by Cha Tae-hyun (also the Phone Call Hint Fairy); Special appearance by Bae Sung-jae through video call on episode 142
144	November 1	76	Ji Chun-hee (Fashion designer)	Phone Call Hint Fairy: Lee Na-young; Special appearances by Han Hye-jin and Irene Kim
145	November 8	77	Lee Juck (Singer-songwriter)	—
146	November 15	78	Lee Seung-gi (Singer, actor, entertainer)	Special appearance by Yoon Jong-shin
147	November 22	79	Lee Dong-gook (Retired professional football player)	Special appearances by Lee Dong-gook's daughters Lee Jae-si, Lee Jae-ah, Lee Sol-ah, Lee Soo-ah, and son Lee Si-an
148	November 29	79	Lee Dong-gook (Retired professional football player)	Special appearances by Park Dong-hyuk and Hyun Young-min
149	December 6	80	Lee Hyung-taik, Jeon Mi-ra (Retired professional tennis players)	—
150	December 13	81	Jung Jae-hyung (Singer-songwriter)	Special appearances by Sean Song, Park Ji-chan and Seol Yo-eun
151	December 20	81	Jung Jae-hyung (Singer-songwriter)	Special appearances by Sean Song, Park Ji-chan and Seol Yo-eun
152	December 27	82	Ryu Hyun-jin (Professional baseball player)	Phone Call Hint Fairy: Choo Shin-soo

== Episodes (2021) ==
List of episodes in 2021 (episode 153–201)

Ep.	Broadcast Date	Master #	Master(s) (Occupation(s))	Note(s)
153	January 3	82	Ryu Hyun-jin (Professional baseball player)	Special voice appearance by Bae Ji-hyun through phone; Special appearances by Yoon Suk-min, Hwang Jae-gyun, Kim Ha-seong and Hyeseong Kim
154	January 10	83	Choi Jung-won, Kim So-hyun, Cha Ji-yeon (Musical actresses)	—
155	January 17	83	Choi Jung-won, Kim So-hyun, Cha Ji-yeon (Musical actresses)	—
155	January 17	84	Jeffrey D. Jones (Lawyer)	—
156	January 24	85	Im Tae-hyuk, Park Jung-woo, Noh Beom-soo, Heo Seon-haeng (Korean traditional wrestlers)	Special voice appearance by Cho Jung-sik
157	January 31	86	Kang Sung-tae, Kim Ji-hoon (Lecturer), (2021 CSAT full marks scorer)	—
157	January 31	86	Peppertones, Yoon So-hee (Rock duo), (Actress)	The three masters are from KAIST; Special appearance by Cho Jung-sik
158	February 7	87	In Gyo-jin, So Yi-hyun (Actor), (Actress)	—
159	February 14	88	Eugene (Actress, singer)	Special appearances by Lee Ji-ah and Kim So-yeon
160	February 21	88	Eugene (Actress, singer)	Special appearances by Lee Ji-ah and Kim So-yeon
161	February 28	89	Syuka (YouTuber)	—
162	March 7	90	Tak Jae-hoon, Lee Sang-min (Singers, entertainers)	Special voice appearances by Jang Dong-min, Rain, Lee Soo-geun, Kim Min-soo and Jee Seok-jin through phone
163	March 14	90	Tak Jae-hoon, Lee Sang-min (Singers, entertainers)	Special appearances by Rain and Ciipher
164	March 21	90	Tak Jae-hoon, Lee Sang-min (Singers, entertainers)	Special appearances by Jee Seok-jin, Jang Dong-min, Kim Min-soo, Shim Soo-chang, Solbi, Park Seong-ho, Lee Ji-hye, Lee Jin-ho and Kim Yong-myung
165	March 28	90	Tak Jae-hoon, Lee Sang-min (Singers, entertainers)	Special appearances by Jee Seok-jin, Jang Dong-min, Kim Min-soo, Shim Soo-chang, Solbi and Kim Yong-myung
165	March 28	91	Lee Kyung-kyu (Entertainer)	—
166	April 4	91	Lee Kyung-kyu (Entertainer)	—
167	April 11	91	Lee Kyung-kyu (Entertainer)	Special voice appearance by Sung Yu-ri through phone
168	April 18	92	Kim Jong-kook (Singer, entertainer)	—
169	April 25	92	Kim Jong-kook (Singer, entertainer)	Special voice appearances by Cha Tae-hyun and Jang Hyuk through phone
170	May 2	93	Gyeongbokgung (Note: The first non-person Master of the series) (Main royal palace of the Joseon dynasty)	Master in the Palace Special; Special appearances by Choi Tae-seong, Rosa Kim and Kim Kang-hoon
171	May 9	94	Ahn Jung-hwan (Retired professional football player, television personality)	Shin Sung-rok is absent after testing positive for COVID-19 on April 28
172	May 16	94	Ahn Jung-hwan (Retired professional football player, television personality)	Shin Sung-rok is absent after testing positive for COVID-19 on April 28
173	May 23	95	Kim Tae-won, Kim Kyung-ho, Park Wan-kyu (Guitarist, member of Boohwal), (Rock singer), (Rock singer, member of Boohwal)	Shin Sung-rok is absent after testing positive for COVID-19 on April 28
174	May 30	96	Abhishek Gupta / Lucky, Alberto Mondi, Tyler Rasch, Robin Deiana, Ma Guozhen, Blair Williams, (Note: Via videochat in episode 174); Yuji Hosaka, (Note: Via videochat in episode 175) Chang Mya Mya Thaw (Note: Only appeared in episode 175) (Television personalities), (Political science professor), (Teacher)	Shin Sung-rok is absent after testing positive for COVID-19 on April 28
175	June 6	96	Abhishek Gupta / Lucky, Alberto Mondi, Tyler Rasch, Robin Deiana, Ma Guozhen, Blair Williams, Yuji Hosaka, Chang Mya Mya Thaw (Television personalities), (Political science professor), (Teacher)	Shin Sung-rok is absent after testing positive for COVID-19 on April 28
176	June 13	97	Lee Jang-hee (Folk rock singer-songwriter)	—
177	June 20	97	Lee Jang-hee (Folk rock singer-songwriter)	Shin Sung-rok and Cha Eun-woo's final episode before graduating from the show; Special appearances via video by Song Chang-sik and Jo Young-nam
178	June 27	98	Jeon Myung-goon, Bae Yong-jin, Seo Dong-chul, Kim Jin-ho (Korea Coast Guard officers)	—
179	July 4	98	Jeon Myung-goon, Bae Yong-jin, Seo Dong-chul, Kim Jin-ho (Korea Coast Guard officers)	—
180	July 11	99	Kim Soo-mi (Note: Previously appeared as a master in episodes 44-45 and as a guest in episodes 54-55) (Actress)	Yoo Su-bin joined the show as a permanent cast member; Special appearance by Lee Sang-yoon; Special voice appearance by Suzy through phone
181	July 18	100	Lee Geum-hee (Broadcaster)	—
—	No broadcast of new episodes on July 25, August 1, and August 8 due to the live coverage of the 2020 Tokyo Olympics.			
182	August 15	101	Kim Jung-hwan, Gu Bon-gil, Kim Jun-ho, Oh Sang-uk (Gold medalists in Men's Team Sabre Fencing at 2020 Olympics)	Special appearance by Won Woo-young
183	August 22	101	Kim Jung-hwan, Gu Bon-gil, Kim Jun-ho, Oh Sang-uk (Gold medalists in Men's Team Sabre Fencing at 2020 Olympics)	Kim Dong-hyun is absent for the archery portion of episode 183 and for episode 184; Special appearances by Cho Jung-sik and archery coach Hwang Hyo-jin on episode 184
183	August 22	102	Oh Jin-hyek, Kim Woo-jin, Kang Chae-young, Jang Min-hee, An San, Kim Je-deok (Gold medalists in Archery at 2020 Olympics)	Kim Dong-hyun is absent for the archery portion of episode 183 and for episode 184; Special appearances by Cho Jung-sik and archery coach Hwang Hyo-jin on episode 184
184	August 29	102	Oh Jin-hyek, Kim Woo-jin, Kang Chae-young, Jang Min-hee, An San, Kim Je-deok (Gold medalists in Archery at 2020 Olympics)	Kim Dong-hyun is absent for the archery portion of episode 183 and for episode 184; Special appearances by Cho Jung-sik and archery coach Hwang Hyo-jin on episode 184
185	September 5	103	Kim Eun-hee (Playwright, screenwriter)	Special appearance by medical examiner Ha Hong-il from the National Forensic Examiner's Office
186	September 12	103	Kim Eun-hee (Playwright, screenwriter)	Special appearances by medical examiner Ha Hong-il, prosecutor Seo In-seon from the Supreme Prosecutor's Office, and Jang Hang-jun
187	September 19	104	Yoon Suk Yeol (Lawyer, former Prosecutor General of South Korea)	2022 South Korean presidential election Big 3 Special
188	September 26	105	Lee Jae Myung (Politician, then Governor of Gyeonggi Province)	2022 South Korean presidential election Big 3 Special
189	October 3	106	Lee Nak-yon (Politician, former Prime Minister of South Korea)	2022 South Korean presidential election Big 3 Special
190	October 10	107	Oh Eun-young (Psychiatrist)	Escape from Crisis Special Part 1; Special appearances by Oh Na-mi, Ko Seok-hyun, Lee Dong-gook and Lee Jae-si (Note: Daughter of Lee Dong-gook) on episode 191
191	October 17	107	Oh Eun-young (Psychiatrist)	Escape from Crisis Special Part 1; Special appearances by Oh Na-mi, Ko Seok-hyun, Lee Dong-gook and Lee Jae-si on episode 191
192	October 24	108	Park Jong-bok (Real estate agent)	Escape from Crisis Special Part 2
193	October 31	109	Han Moon-chul (Lawyer)	Escape from Crisis Special Part 3
194	November 7	110	Monika, Lip J, Aiki, Rian, Gabee, Yeojin, Leejung, Rageon (Dancers, dance choreographers and contestants of Korean show Street Woman Fighter)	K-Woman Special Part 1; Special appearance by Cho Jung-sik on episode 195
195	November 14	110	Monika, Lip J, Aiki, Rian, Gabee, Yeojin, Leejung, Rageon (Dancers, dance choreographers and contestants of Korean show Street Woman Fighter)	K-Woman Special Part 1; Special appearance by Cho Jung-sik on episode 195
196	November 21	111	Lee Kyung-sil, Park Sun-young, Choi Yeo-jin, Yang Eun-ji, Saori Fujimoto (Cast of Korean show Shooting Stars)	K-Woman Special Part 2; Special appearances by Cho Jung-sik, Kim Byung-ji and Choi Jin-cheul
197	November 28	112	Kim Chang-ok (Actor, entrepreneur, writer)	—
198	December 5	113	Hong Hye-geol, Yeo Esther (Doctors)	—
199	December 12	114	Woo Young-mi (Fashion designer)	Special appearances by landscape and interior designers Woo Kyung-mi and Woo Hyun-mi (Note: Woo Woung-mi's older and younger sisters)
200	December 19	115	Jung Jae-hyung (Note: Previously appeared as a master in episodes 150-151) (Singer-songwriter)	Special appearances by Robin Deiana and Julian Quintart; Special appearance by Yook Sungjae (BTOB) after finishing his military duty
201	December 26	115	Jung Jae-hyung (Singer-songwriter)	Special appearances by Robin Deiana, Abhishek Gupta/Lucky, Daniel Lindemann, Alberto Mondi, Guillaume Patry, Julian Quintart, Cho Jung-sik, Philstring orchestra, and the Brillante Children's Choir

== Episodes (2022) ==
List of episodes in 2022 (episode 202–238)

Ep.	Broadcast Date	Master #	Master(s) (Occupation(s))	Note(s)
202	January 2	116	Bae Sang-min (Industrial design professor from KAIST)	—
203	January 9	116	Bae Sang-min (Industrial design professor from KAIST)	—
203	January 9	117	Kim Dong-hwan (Financial advisor, stock broker)	Special appearances by Park Jong-bok, (Note: Previously appeared as a master in episode 192) Kim Seung-joo and Jeon Won-ju in episode 204
204	January 16	117	Kim Dong-hwan (Financial advisor, stock broker)	Special appearances by Park Jong-bok, Kim Seung-joo and Jeon Won-ju in episode 204
205	January 23	118	Kim Young-chul, Tyler Rasch (Note: Previously appeared as master on episodes 139 and 174-175) (Television personalities)	Overcoming Short-Lived Resolutions Special Part 1
206	January 30	119	Yeo Joo-yeop (Ryo), Seo Jung-won (James), Oh Dong-gyu (Louis) (Fitness instructors of YouTube fitness channel ALLBLANC TV)	Overcoming Short-Lived Resolutions Special Part 2
207	February 6	120	Yoo Yong-wook (Chef)	Meat and Vegetables Special Part 1
No broadcast of new episode on February 13 due to the live coverage of the 2022 Winter Olympics.
208	February 20	121	Jeong Kwan (Buddhist nun and Chef)	Meat and Vegetables Special Part 2
209	February 27	122	Kwon Il-yong, Park Ji-sun, Lee Dong-won, Do Joon-woo (Social psychologist), (Professor), (PDs of Unanswered Questions)	Unanswered Masters Part 1; Special voice appearance by Kim Nam-gil via phone; Yang Se-hyung is absent after testing positive for COVID-19
210	March 6	123	Choi Min-jeong, Hwang Dae-heon (Short track speed skaters)	Special appearances by Bae Sung-jae and Park Seung-hi
211	March 13	122	Kwon Il-yong, Park Ji-sun, Lee Dong-won, Do Joon-woo (Social psychologist), (Professor), (PDs of Unanswered Questions)	Unanswered Masters Part 2; Yang Se-hyung is absent
212	March 20	124	Bae Jong-ok (Actress)	Special appearance by Professor of Korean Medicine Cho Byung-je
213	March 27	125	Jeong Jae-seung (Neuroscientist and Professor)	This Is Not the Brain You Know Special - Part 1: Understanding My Brain
214	April 3	125	Jeong Jae-seung (Neuroscientist and Professor)	This Is Not the Brain You Know Special - Part 2: The Brain's Choices
215	April 10	125	Jeong Jae-seung (Neuroscientist and Professor)	This Is Not the Brain You Know Special - Part 3: Brain and Love; Yoo Su-bin's final episode before graduating from the show
216	April 17	126	Kim Eung-soo (Actor)	Eun Ji-won joins the show as a permanent cast member
217	April 24	127	Yoo Hyun-joon (Architect)	Part 1: Knowing My Space
218	May 1	127	Yoo Hyun-joon (Architect)	Part 2: Meeting My Dream Space; Special appearance by Kim Je-dong
219	May 8	128	Yoshihiro Akiyama / Choo Sung-hoon (Note: Previously appeared as a master on episode 132) (Mixed Martial Artist)	—
220	May 15	128	Yoshihiro Akiyama / Choo Sung-hoon (Mixed Martial Artist)	Special appearances by Jung Chan-sung and Cho Jung-sik
221	May 22	129	Hong Hye-geol, Yeo Esther (Note: Previously appeared as masters on episode 198) (Doctors)	Married Couples' Day Special; Special appearances by Jung Jae-eun and Seo Hyun-chul
222	May 29	130	Kim Joo-won (Prima Ballerina)	Special appearances by ballerino Kim Hyun-woong and ballerinas Choi Ye-won and Yoon Seo-jun
223	June 5	131	Kim Young-ha (Writer)	—
224	June 12	131	Kim Young-ha (Writer)	—
225	June 19	132	Sumi Jo (Coloratura soprano)	—
226	June 26	132	Sumi Jo (Coloratura soprano)	—
227	July 3	133	Blue House	Doyoung (NCT) joins the show as a permanent cast member; Kim Dong-hyun is absent for these episodes due to a knee injury.; Special appearances by historian Shim Yong-hwan, official photographers Hong Song-kyu and Jang Chul-young (Ep. 227), executive chef Cheon Sang-hyun (Ep. 228), and chief bodyguard Jang Ki-boong (Ep. 228)
228	July 10	133	Blue House	Doyoung (NCT) joins the show as a permanent cast member; Kim Dong-hyun is absent for these episodes due to a knee injury.; Special appearances by historian Shim Yong-hwan, official photographers Hong Song-kyu and Jang Chul-young (Ep. 227), executive chef Cheon Sang-hyun (Ep. 228), and chief bodyguard Jang Ki-boong (Ep. 228)
229	July 17	134	Lee So-ra (Model)	—
230	July 24	135	Kwak Jaesik (Novelist)	—
231	July 31	136	Lee In-cheol, Yoon Jung-seop, Park Jun-young (Lawyers)	—
232	August 7	137	Lee Jung-jae, Jung Woo-sung (Actors)	Bromance Special: Part 1
233	August 14	137	Lee Jung-jae, Jung Woo-sung (Actors)	Bromance Special: Part 1
234	August 21	138	Shin Hyun-joon, Jung Joon-ho (Actors)	Bromance Special: Part 2; Doyoung is absent for these episodes
235	August 28	138	Shin Hyun-joon, Jung Joon-ho (Actors)	Bromance Special: Part 2; Doyoung is absent for these episodes
236	September 4	139	Han Sang-bo, Hong Seong-woo, Im Ik-kang (Doctors)	"Doctors Without Shame" Special; Special voice appearances by MMA fighter Ko Seuk-hyun and Yook Joong-wan through phone (Ep. 237)
237	September 11	139	Han Sang-bo, Hong Seong-woo, Im Ik-kang (Doctors)	"Doctors Without Shame" Special; Special voice appearances by MMA fighter Ko Seuk-hyun and Yook Joong-wan through phone (Ep. 237)
238	September 18	140	Song Chang-sik (Singer)	Special appearance by Jung Hoon-hee; End of Season 1

== Episodes (2023) ==
List of episodes in 2023 (episode 239–present)

Overall Episode #	Season Episode #	Broadcast Date	Master #	Master(s) (Occupation(s))	Note(s)
239	1	January 1	141	Im Chang-jung, Lee So-ra, Kim Young-chul, Lee Hyung-taik (Singer-songwriter/actor, model, comedian, retired professional tennis player) (Note: Previously appeared as masters in Season 1 on episodes 140-141, 229, 205 and 149, respectively)	Start of Season 2; 2023 Nip-and-Tuck Trends: Golf vs. Tennis
240	2	January 8	141	Im Chang-jung, Lee So-ra, Kim Young-chul, Lee Hyung-taik (Singer-songwriter/actor, model, comedian, retired professional tennis player)	Start of Season 2; 2023 Nip-and-Tuck Trends: Golf vs. Tennis
240	2	January 8	142	Shin Hyun-joon, Jung Joon-ho, Kwak Jeong-eun (Actors, (Note: Both previously appeared as masters in Season 1 on episodes 234-235) columnist)	2023 Nip-and-Tuck Trends: Married vs. Unmarried; Special appearance by Lee Dae-ho's family
241	3	January 15	142	Shin Hyun-joon, Jung Joon-ho, Kwak Jeong-eun (Actors, columnist)	2023 Nip-and-Tuck Trends: Married vs. Unmarried; Special appearance by Lee Dae-ho's family
242	4	January 22	143	Choo Shin-soo (Baseball player)	"Teach Us Anything"; Special appearances by Choo Shin-soo's wife, Ha Won-mi (Ep. 242–243), by SSG Landers' Oh Tae-gon, Choi Ji-hoon, Park Jong-hun, Park Seong-han (Ep. 243) and by SBS announcers Jung Woo-young and Lee Dong-hyeon (Ep. 243)
243	5	January 29	143	Choo Shin-soo (Baseball player)	"Teach Us Anything"; Special appearances by Choo Shin-soo's wife, Ha Won-mi (Ep. 242–243), by SSG Landers' Oh Tae-gon, Choi Ji-hoon, Park Jong-hun, Park Seong-han (Ep. 243) and by SBS announcers Jung Woo-young and Lee Dong-hyeon (Ep. 243)
244	6	February 5	144	Jin Seon-kyu (Actor)	Doyoung is absent for this episode; "Gratitude, Sincerity, Humility" Expedition
245	7	February 12	145	Joo Eon-kyu (Note: Previously known on his Youtube channel as Sinsaimdang) (Producing Director, Online Content Creator)	Doyoung and BamBam are absent for this episode; Special appearance by the master's family
246	8	February 19	146	Kim Eun-jung, Kim Yeong-mi, Kim Seon-yeong, Kim Kyeong-ae, Kim Cho-hi (Curlers)	BamBam is absent for this episode; Special appearances by announcer Cho Jung-sik and curling coach Im Myung-seob
247	9	February 26	147	Park Hang-seo (Soccer Coach) (Note: Previously appeared as master in Season 1 on episodes 14-16)	The cast heads to Hanoi, Vietnam for filming; Special video messages by members of the Vietnam national football team (Ep. 248)
248	10	March 5	147	Park Hang-seo (Soccer Coach)	The cast heads to Hanoi, Vietnam for filming; Special video messages by members of the Vietnam national football team (Ep. 248)
No broadcast of new episode on March 12 due to the live coverage of the 2023 World Short Track Speed Skating Championships.
249	11	March 19	148	Yang Jae-jin, Yang Jae-woong (Psychiatrists)	Doyoung is absent for this episode
250	12	March 26	149	Jeong Jae-seung (Neuroscientist and Professor) (Note: Previously appeared as master in Season 1 on episodes 213-215)	4-week special project on the Nature of Humans following material from the master's graduate course at KAIST
251	13	April 2	149	Jeong Jae-seung (Neuroscientist and Professor)	4-week special project on the Nature of Humans following material from the master's graduate course at KAIST
252	14	April 9	149	Jeong Jae-seung (Neuroscientist and Professor)	4-week special project on the Nature of Humans following material from the master's graduate course at KAIST
253	15	April 16	149	Jeong Jae-seung (Neuroscientist and Professor)	4-week special project on the Nature of Humans following material from the master's graduate course at KAIST
254	16	April 23	-	None	Interviews with cast members and highlights of best moments and behind-the-scenes from seasons 1 and 2; Special appearances by Lee Seung-gi and Lee Sang-yoon; End of Season 2

== Ratings ==
- The table below show the highest rating received in red, and the lowest rating in blue each year.
- NR denotes that the show did not rank in the top 20 daily programs on that date.

=== 2017–2018 ===
List of ratings in 2017-2018 (episode 1–50)

Ep.	Broadcast Date	TNmS Ratings		AGB Ratings	
Ep.	Broadcast Date	Part 1	Part 2	Part 1	Part 2
1	December 31, 2017	6.8%	10.5%	6.5%	10.4%
2	January 7, 2018	5.6%	6.4%	6.6%	7.6%
3	January 14	6.3%	6.5%	7.3%	7.2%
4	January 21	6.5%	8.4%	7.3%	8.8%
5	January 28	6.4%	8.4%	7.7%	9.1%
6	February 4	7.7%	9.8%	6.2%	9.5%
7	February 11	7.2%	7.4%	7.6%	8.0%
8	February 25	6.1%	8.6%	6.2%	9.5%
9	March 4	6.9%	7.4%	7.7%	8.6%
10	March 11	7.3%	10.5%	7.6%	10.7%
11	March 18	5.7%	9.0%	7.4%	10.9%
12	March 25	7.4%	9.5%	8.0%	10.4%
13	April 1	7.5%	8.3%	7.6%	8.9%
14	April 8	7.4%	10.6%	9.2%	11.7%
15	April 15	6.3%	8.4%	7.0%	9.1%
16	April 22	6.6%	9.3%	6.3%	9.6%
17	April 29	6.6%	8.6%	6.4%	8.3%
18	May 6	6.3%	8.9%	5.8%	8.5%
19	May 13	7.7%	9.1%	6.7%	10.5%
20	May 20	7.0%	9.0%	6.1%	8.3%
21	May 27	5.5%	7.7%	6.7%	10.4%
22	June 3	7.0%	8.7%	7.7%	9.2%
23	June 10	6.8%	10.7%	7.3%	11.0%
24	June 17	6.8%	7.8%	7.0%	8.5%
25	June 24	7.5%	11.0%	7.5%	10.2%
26	July 1	9.4%	10.9%	8.9%	10.7%
27	July 8	7.2%	9.5%	6.6%	8.8%
28	July 15	7.8%	9.6%	6.2%	8.6%
29	July 22	9.2%	10.1%	8.0%	9.6%
30	July 29	7.0%	8.3%	6.6%	8.4%
31	August 5	6.1%	7.7%	5.7%	7.5%
32	August 12	4.5%	6.9%	5.6%	8.0%
33	August 26	7.2%	9.0%	8.1%	10.4%
34	September 2	6.6%	8.2%	6.9%	8.7%
35	September 9	8.7%	11.6%	8.5%	11.9%
36	September 16	7.7%	9.9%	8.0%	11.5%
37	September 23	5.6%	7.9%	6.3%	9.5%
38	September 30	7.4%	9.8%	7.9%	10.9%
39	October 7	7.3%	10.0%	7.4%	10.5%
40	October 14	7.9%	10.7%	8.0%	11.6%
41	October 21	6.9%	9.0%	8.0%	9.6%
42	October 28	NR	8.2%	6.0%	9.3%
43	November 11	7.4%	9.6%	7.3%	8.6%
44	November 18	7.7%	10.6%	7.1%	10.2%
45	November 25	9.2%	11.4%	8.3%	11.6%
46	December 2	8.7%	10.9%	8.7%	12.1%
47	December 9	8.7%	10.3%	8.8%	10.5%
48	December 16	8.3%	9.1%	8.4%	8.4%
49	December 23	7.2%	7.5%	5.7%	7.2%
50	December 30	7.8%	8.9%	7.6%	8.7%

=== 2019 ===
List of ratings in 2019 (episode 51–100)

Ep.	Broadcast Date	TNmS Ratings		AGB Ratings	
Ep.	Broadcast Date	Part 1	Part 2	Part 1	Part 2
51	January 6	7.2%	8.0%	7.5%	9.1%
52	January 13	6.9%	7.2%	6.4%	7.8%
53	January 20	NR	7.4%	6.4%	9.2%
54	January 27	7.9%	9.1%	7.5%	9.9%
55	February 3	6.6%	6.6%	6.1%	7.3%
56	February 10	7.4%	8.5%	8.1%	10.1%
57	February 17	NR	7.6%	5.9%	7.5%
58	February 24	NR	NR	6.0%	6.7%
59	March 3	NR	NR	5.3%	5.9%
60	March 10	7.5%	10.1%	7.2%	11.1%
61	March 17	6.2%	9.2%	6.7%	10.2%
62	March 24	6.3%	9.3%	5.9%	9.2%
63	March 31	7.9%	10.4%	7.1%	10.4%
64	April 7	NR	7.2%	6.0%	8.0%
65	April 14	6.1%	6.4%	5.5%	6.5%
66	April 21	6.0%	7.5%	5.4%	7.8%
67	April 28	NR	NR	4.9%	6.1%
68	May 5	NR	5.3%	4.3%	5.3%
69	May 12	NR	5.3%	3.7%	5.5%
70	May 19	6.7%	8.3%	6.9%	8.7%
71	May 26	NR	6.2%	4.6%	6.1%
72	June 2	5.0%	7.1%	4.9%	7.8%
73	June 9	NR	6.2%	5.5%	7.1%
74	June 16	NR	7.7%	6.0%	8.5%
75	June 23	NR	6.0%	4.7%	6.2%
76	July 7	NR	NR	4.2%	4.8%
77	July 14	6.3%	9.8%	6.3%	9.9%
78	July 21	NR	NR	6.2%	10.0%
79	July 28	NR	NR	5.8%	7.0%
80	August 4	NR	NR	4.8%	6.3%
81	August 11	NR	NR	4.2%	5.6%
82	August 18	NR	NR	5.7%	6.3%
83	August 25	NR	NR	5.2%	5.6%
84	September 1	NR	5.6%	4.9%	5.8%
85	September 8	NR	6.5%	5.6%	6.6%
86	September 15	NR	7.4%	5.1%	7.5%
87	September 22	NR	7.3%	6.6%	7.4%
88	September 29	5.9%	NR	4.5%	4.5%
89	October 6	NR	6.7%	4.7%	6.0%
90	October 13	NR	NR	3.8%	5.2%
91	October 20	NR	7.4%	5.5%	6.7%
92	October 27	6.4%	7.1%	5.6%	7.2%
93	November 3	7.1%	9.8%	7.1%	11.2%
94	November 10	6.4%	7.7%	5.9%	7.8%
95	November 24	7.3%	9.1%	6.9%	9.6%
96	December 1	7.4%	7.4%	7.4%	8.0%
97	December 8	NR	7.6%	4.9%	6.7%
98	December 15	NR	NR	5.4%	7.6%
99	December 22	NR	NR	5.8%	7.1%
100	December 29	NR	NR	5.9%	7.2%

=== 2020 ===
List of ratings in 2020 (episode 101–152)

Ep.	Broadcast Date	AGB Ratings	
Ep.	Broadcast Date	Part 1	Part 2
101	January 5	4.6%	6.1%
102	January 12	3.9%	5.4%
103	January 19	4.8%	6.2%
104	January 26	3.3%	4.2%
105	February 2	5.0%	6.9%
106	February 9	4.4%	6.3%
107	February 16	4.3%	5.5%
108	February 23	5.2%	7.3%
109	March 1	6.3%	9.3%
110	March 8	5.1%	7.4%
111	March 15	5.3%	5.1%
112	March 22	4.0%	4.5%
113	March 29	3.8%	5.3%
114	April 5	4.6%	5.4%
115	April 12	NR	7.3%
116	April 19	4.2%	5.5%
117	April 26	4.5%	5.3%
118	May 3	4.1%	5.0%
119	May 10	3.3%	4.0%
120	May 17	4.4%	5.3%
121	May 24	3.2%	4.7%
122	May 31	5.7%	7.3%
123	June 7	4.8%	6.2%
124	June 14	4.3%	5.4%
125	June 21	4.2%	4.2%
126	June 28	3.8%	4.4%
127	July 5	4.0%	4.2%
128	July 12	4.2%	5.0%
129	July 19	4.2%	4.2%
130	July 26	4.5%	4.5%
131	August 2	4.1%	4.7%
132	August 9	4.7%	5.9%
133	August 16	3.2%	4.2%
134	August 23	3.6%	4.7%
135	August 30	3.0%	4.4%
136	September 6	4.4%	5.3%
137	September 13	5.1%	6.3%
138	September 20	4.2%	5.4%
139	September 27	4.1%	5.3%
140	October 4	5.1%	5.4%
141	October 11	NR	5.6%
142	October 18	4.2%	4.7%
143	October 25	3.4%	4.5%
144	November 1	4.6%	5.9%
145	November 8	3.4%	3.9%
146	November 15	5.0%	5.5%
147	November 22	5.2%	7.4%
148	November 29	4.2%	4.7%
149	December 6	4.4%	5.6%
150	December 13	4.5%	5.0%
151	December 20	4.5%	5.1%
152	December 27	5.2%	7.4%

=== 2021 ===
List of ratings in 2021 (episode 153–201)

Ep.	Broadcast Date	AGB Ratings	
Ep.	Broadcast Date	Part 1	Part 2
153	January 3	5.2%	6.5%
154	January 10	5.0%	5.1%
155	January 17	5.0%	6.2%
156	January 24	4.9%	5.2%
157	January 31	5.8%	6.0%
158	February 7	4.5%	5.2%
159	February 14	5.2%	5.7%
160	February 21	5.1%	6.3%
161	February 28	4.7%	6.1%
162	March 7	4.6%	6.0%
163	March 14	5.7%	8.0%
164	March 21	4.8%	6.1%
165	March 28	4.7%	5.3%
166	April 4	4.4%	5.5%
167	April 11	4.3%	4.3%
168	April 18	4.6%	4.7%
169	April 25	4.1%	4.1%
170	May 2	4.3%	4.3%
171	May 9	3.8%	3.8%
172	May 16	4.9%	5.4%
173	May 23	4.3%	4.4%
174	May 30	4.2%	4.7%
175	June 6	4.0%	4.2%
176	June 13	4.4%	5.2%
177	June 20	4.0%	3.2%
178	June 27	4.1%	4.7%
179	July 4	4.6%	
180	July 11	4.1%	
181	July 18	4.5%	
182	August 15	4.3%	
183	August 22	5.9%	
184	August 29	5.9%	
185	September 5	3.4%	
186	September 12	3.6%	
187	September 19	7.4%	
188	September 26	9.0%	
189	October 3	6.2%	
190	October 10	5.0%	
191	October 17	5.3%	
192	October 24	5.5%	
193	October 31	5.3%	
194	November 7	4.3%	
195	November 14	4.5%	
196	November 21	4.7%	
197	November 28	4.2%	
198	December 5	5.5%	
199	December 12	4.4%	
200	December 19	3.9%	
201	December 26	3.9%	

=== 2022 ===
List of ratings in 2022 (episode 202–238)

Ep.	Broadcast Date	AGB Ratings
202	January 2	5.5%
203	January 9	4.8%
204	January 16	6.0%
205	January 23	5.3%
206	January 30	2.9%
207	February 6	5.2%
208	February 20	5.4%
209	February 27	4.2%
210	March 6	5.3%
211	March 13	4.6%
212	March 20	4.3%
213	March 27	4.8%
214	April 3	3.9%
215	April 10	4.2%
216	April 17	3.4%
217	April 24	4.1%
218	May 1	3.9%
219	May 8	3.6%
220	May 15	3.6%
221	May 22	3.7%
222	May 29	2.4%
223	June 5	2.6%
224	June 12	2.3%
225	June 19	4.1%
226	June 26	3.6%
227	July 3	4.3%
228	July 10	5.2%
229	July 17	3.0%
230	July 24	3.4%
231	July 31	4.4%
232	August 7	3.8%
233	August 14	3.7%
234	August 21	3.9%
235	August 28	4.1%
236	September 4	4.0%
237	September 11	3.5%
238	September 18	4.2%

=== 2023 ===
List of ratings in 2023 (episode 239–present)

Ep.	Broadcast Date	AGB Ratings
239	January 1	1.9%
240	January 8	1.9%
241	January 15	2.3%
242	January 22	1.7%
243	January 29	1.7%
244	February 5	1.8%
245	February 12	2.5%
246	February 19	1.1%
247	February 26	2.6%
248	March 5	1.9%
249	March 19	2.5%
250	March 26	1.6%
251	April 2	1.5%
252	April 9	1.9%
253	April 16	1.9%
254	April 23	1.6%

== International versions ==
=== Malaysia ===
In January 2022, Malaysia was the first country in Asia that picked up to release its own version of Master in the House, known as Master in the House Malaysia (MITHM), which was jointly produced by Primeworks Studios and SBS. A press conference was held at Petaling Jaya Performing Arts Centre in One Utama Shopping Centre, Petaling Jaya, featuring five Malaysian Masters: Siti Nurhaliza, Yusof Haslam, Rashid Sidek, Sherson Lian, and WAU Animation founder Usamah Zaid. Five celebrities were chosen as fixed cast members: Hael Husaini, Andi Bernadee, Meyrasam (Cassia), Scha Elinnea and Sharifah Rose. The show will have 10 episodes, and would be broadcast weekly on TV3 starting January 15, 2022, on every Saturday night at 22:00 (MST).

== Awards and nominations ==
Year	Award	Category	Recipient(s)	Result	Ref.
2018	45th Korean Broadcasting Awards	Best Entertainment Variety Show Award	Master in the House	Won	
2018	12th SBS Entertainment Awards	Grand Award (Daesang)	Lee Seung-gi	Won	
2018	12th SBS Entertainment Awards	Top Excellence Award (Show/Talk)	Yang Se-hyung	Won	
2018	12th SBS Entertainment Awards	Excellence Award (Variety)	Yook Sung-jae	Won	
2018	12th SBS Entertainment Awards	Screenwriter Award	Kim Myung-jung	Won	
2018	12th SBS Entertainment Awards	Male Rookie Award	Lee Sang-yoon	Won	
2019	55th Baeksang Arts Awards	Best Variety Performer – Male	Yang Se-hyung	Nominated	
2019	13th SBS Entertainment Awards				
2019	13th SBS Entertainment Awards	Grand Award (Daesang)	Lee Seung-gi	Nominated	
2019	13th SBS Entertainment Awards	Honorary Employee Award	Yang Se-hyung	Won	
2019	13th SBS Entertainment Awards	Excellence Award (Show/Variety)	Lee Sang-yoon	Won	
2019	13th SBS Entertainment Awards	Producer's Award	Lee Seung-gi	Won	
2019	13th SBS Entertainment Awards	SNS Star Award	Yook Sung-jae	Won	
2019	13th SBS Entertainment Awards	Best Teamwork Award	Master in the House team (Note: with Lee Seung-gi, Lee Sang-yoon, Yang Se-hyung and Yook Sung-jae)	Won	
2020	14th SBS Entertainment Awards	Grand Award (Daesang)	Lee Seung-gi	Nominated	
2020	14th SBS Entertainment Awards	Grand Award (Daesang)	Yang Se-hyung	Nominated	
2020	14th SBS Entertainment Awards	Hot Star Award (OTT)	Lee Seung-gi	Won	
2020	14th SBS Entertainment Awards	Rookie Award	Cha Eun-woo	Won	
2020	14th SBS Entertainment Awards	Best Entertainer Award	Shin Sung-rok	Won	
2020	14th SBS Entertainment Awards	Producers' Award	Yang Se-hyung	Won	
2020	14th SBS Entertainment Awards	Excellence Award (Show/Variety)	Kim Dong-hyun	Won	
2021	57th Baeksang Arts Awards	Best Male Variety Performer	Lee Seung-gi	Won	
2021	48th Korea Broadcasting Awards	Best Male Reality Star	Yang Se-hyung	Won	
2021	15th SBS Entertainment Awards	Producer Award	Lee Seung-gi	Won	
2021	15th SBS Entertainment Awards	Best Teamwork Award	Master in the House team (Note: with Lee Seung-gi, Yang Se-hyung, Kim Dong-hyun and Yoo Su-bin)	Won	
2021	15th SBS Entertainment Awards	Entertainer of the Year Award	Yang Se-hyung	Won	
2021	15th SBS Entertainment Awards	Entertainer of the Year Award	Lee Seung-gi	Won	

== See also ==
- The Return of Superman
