= Blair Williams (disambiguation) =

Blair Williams (born 1992) is an Australian television personality working in South Korea.

Blair Williams may also refer to:

- Blair Williams, a fictional character played by Moon Bloodgood in the 2009 American military science fiction action film Terminator Salvation
- Blair Williams, a performer in the animated television series The Adventures of Chuck and Friends
