= Mark Tetto =

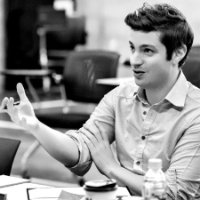
- Born: March 1, 1980 (age 46); New Jersey
- Education: Princeton University (BA); Wharton School (MBA)
- Occupation: Partner at TCK investments
- Website: Mark Tetto on Instagram

Mark Tetto (born March 1, 1980) is an American who lives and performs in South Korea as a television personality and businessman. He is currently a cast member in the variety show Non Summit and Where Is My Friend's Home.

== Personal ==
He was born to Italian parents who were immigrants to the United States.

After moving to South Korea, he gave himself a Korean name "Tae Hyeon Jun (태현준)" with his Korean last name "Tae" inspired by his original family name "Tetto."

He is known to be living in a traditional Korean house (hanok) located in Bukchon, Seoul. The beautifully designed and structured interiors of his house and his private collection of ancient Korean porcelains were often featured in TV shows. He also named his house as "Pyeonghaengjae" which can be translated as "parallel' in Korean with the intention of also referring to a place where many people and friends can peacefully interact in a parallel space surrounded by nature.

Mark has recently reported that he has been engaged in learning the Korean string instrument, gayageum.

=== Education and Work ===
He graduated with a Bachelor of Arts in Chemistry from Princeton University in 2002, and with a Master of Business Administration from the Wharton School of the University of Pennsylvania in 2007. From 2002 to 2004, he was Supervisor and General Manager for McMaster-Carr in New Brunswick, New Jersey. Between 2007 and 2010, he was an associate in the Investment Banking Division for Morgan Stanley. He moved to South Korea to work as a Senior Manager in the Corporate Strategic Planning Team for Samsung Electronics from 2010 to 2014. He was with Vingle as a Chief financial officer for about a year.

In addition to his native English language, he speaks fluent Korean and Italian.

== Career ==
Due to appearances in April 2015, on the Non-Summit spin-off Where Is My Friend's Home, in Nepal, and the subsequent April 2015 Nepal earthquake and the May 2015 Nepal earthquake, he became a spokesperson for JTBC and the two television shows, along with Nepalese cast member Sujan Shakya, for outreach.

== Filmography ==
=== Television series ===
Year	Title	Network	Role	Notes
2014, 2016–present	Non-Summit	JTBC	Himself	cast member
2015	Where Is My Friend's Home	JTBC	Himself	cast member
