= Non-Summit =

South Korean television program

- Promotional poster with original cast, 2014
- Also known as: Abnormal Summit
- Hangul: 비정상회담
- Hanja: 非正常會談
- RR: Bijeongsang hoedam
- MR: Pijŏngsang hoedam
- Genre: Talk-variety show
- Written by: Hong Yun-kyung; Shin Hye-rim; Kim Na-young
- Directed by: Kim Hee-jung (Season 1, 1st part); Kim No-eun (Season 1, 2nd part); Kim Jae-won; Jeong Jae-hoon; Sung Han; Kang Hong-joo
- Presented by: Jun Hyun-moo; Sung Si-kyung; Yoo Se-yoon
- Starring: Guillaume Patry; Alberto Mondi; Mark Tetto; Alex Mazzucchelli; Zahid Hussain; Aurélien Loubert; Christian Burgos; Ogi Hitoshi; Wang Xinlin
- Country of origin: South Korea
- Original language: Korean
- No. of seasons: 1
- No. of episodes: 177 (list of episodes)

Production
- Executive producers: Lim Jung-ah (Season 1, 1st part); Cho Seung-wook (Season 1, 2nd part)
- Running time: 75–85 minutes

Original release
- Network: JTBC
- Release: July 7, 2014 – December 4, 2017

Non-Summit (Korean: 비정상회담), also known as Abnormal Summit, is a South Korean television program on JTBC which first aired on July 7, 2014. The show features a panel of non-Korean men, living in South Korea, who debate on various topics and "Korean culture, through the eyes of a foreigner," in a talk show format, in the Korean language. The show concluded its first season on December 4, 2017 with Episode 177, with no set date for a new season.

== Development ==
The show started productions with veteran Lim Jung-ah, who produced Star Edition, and co-produced, with Yeo Woon-hyuk, variety shows MBC's Radio Star, and JTBC's Men's Stuff, after coming over to the cable company, from the major networks, in 2011.

The show's format, presented with humor, is meant to emulate a meeting of world leaders, like Doctors Without Borders, i.e. "Youth Without Borders"; or the United Nations, or G11, and is hosted by Jun Hyun-moo "Chairman", Yoo Se-yoon "Secretary General", and Sung Si-kyung "Chairman", with guest appearances by South Korean celebrities, guest "representatives", who announce the weekly topics. The stated mission: "The youth group, without borders, Non-Summit, is a variety show, that strives for peace and security, for the world's youth, by speaking on agendas, and debating with abnormals, who insist they're representatives."

The show has been compared to KBS2's 2006 Global Talk Show (Misuda), which had female foreigners discussing global issues. Host Yoo Se-yoon said their new show would go a step further than getting to know one another's cultures, and would include problem solving, coming up with "what's better, together." Lim said the show's in-depth discussions made fluency in Korean the number one standard for casting the global guests. Lim said, "The cast of foreign people was because, although Korea is reinforcing its position on the global stage right now, it still is just one country among many others. And I thought perceiving the problems of Koreans who are in their 20s and 30s, in a universal perspective, was necessary."

=== Production changes ===
Along with 7 new and 2 returning representatives, a reorganization of the show (ep. 103 onward) also introduced some changes to the show's production crew. Chief Producer (CP) Lim Jung-ah was replaced by Cho Seung-wook, who created KBS2 Yahaengsung or Night Star, and Hidden Singer after joining JTBC. PD Kim Hee-jung, also with the show since the beginning, was replaced by Kim No-eun of JTBC's Off to School and Mary and I.

== Cast ==
=== Original cast ===
The show's format of a summit, refers to the foreign cast, eleven at time the show first aired, as "Representatives" from their individual countries, who make up an International panel. Promotions and news reports noted several of them for the notoriety they had made for themselves prior to the show: United Kingdom's James Hooper, National Geographic explorer and mountain climber; Canada's Guillaume Patry, professional StarCraft pro-gamer; Japan's Takuya Terada, a model and member of K-pop multi-national group Cross Gene; Italy's Alberto Mondi, a Fiat foreign car dealer; China's TV announcer Zhang Yu'an; and United States's Tyler Rasch, a scholar at Seoul National University, who runs a webzine about Seoul.

Others came to South Korea, as students and young workers: Belgium's Julian Quintart, former student with Rotary Youth Exchange, singer/actor/TV personality; France's Robin Deiana, former exchange student at Konkuk University, model; and Australia's Daniel Snoeks, the youngest, followed by Terada, is best known for his tattoos.

Ghana's Sam Okyere, who has appeared on other variety shows in South Korea, a graduate of Sogang University, and official ambassador for seaweed in Wando in South Korea, became known for his mischievous behavior. Turkey's Enes Kaya, who acted in the Korean film Haunters, became an outgoing debater on the panel.

In an interview about the show's "debate" style, Julian Quintart said he hoped the program to be an introduction to South Korea to the debate culture, and expressed the importance of having healthy discussions, with consideration of the opponent's view. Takuya Terada addressed the sensitive topic of the Asian countries, that come up in the debates, "Japan, Korea, and China are all close to each other, but if you look at their history, they're really far apart. Since the histories are all different, it can only be a delicate topic, but through this program, I'm glad we can talk about it and take the time to understand each other."

=== 2014 ===
On Episode 5, Daniel Lindemann from Germany, who studied Korean language at University of Bonn and works at a Korean company; replaced United Kingdom's James Hooper, who has left for Australia to work on a PhD.

Visiting "intern" representatives, made up of male foreign students and workers in South Korea, were added to the cast, and filled in for vacationing, or otherwise missing, representatives on Episodes 11, 12, 13, and 17.

On October 23, 2014, media reported that Daniel Snoeks would be leaving the show to return to his studies in Australia, and had taped a final appearance for the Episode 17, October 27 show. One of the show's directors, Kim Hee-jung confirmed the report; and the news stated that plans were being made to replace the empty seat with visiting "intern" representatives to show a "more diverse culture."

On December 2, 2014, media reported Enes Kaya's alleged involvement in a scandal. Kaya released a statement denying the allegations, but said that he would voluntarily leave the show to not cause damages.

=== 2015 ===
On January 6, 2015, media reported that visiting intern representatives Ilya Belyakov, Blair Williams, and Sujan Shakya would become fixed cast members, changing the show's original G11 format to a G12 setup. Russia's Belyakov, the visiting intern on Episode 20, studied at Yonsei University, and works as a medical translator. He has been in Korea for eleven years and said he wants to "break prejudices of Russia" and talk about Russia's relationship with America and China. Williams, from Australia, who was on Episode 22, and also attended Yonsei University, after double majoring in business management and Korean at University of Queensland, works as a marketing strategist. And Nepal's Shakya, from Episode 27, has been in Korea since 2010, studies urban planning at Dankook University and hopes to bring awareness to Nepal and teach others about his country.

On June 20, 2015, Director Kim Hee-jung announced that six members of the cast, Belyakov, Quintart, Shakya, Deiana, Williams and Terada, would be leaving. She said the change was in order to introduce new cultures and for viewers to hear the reactions of other countries; with new members to be announced on July 6. The six members said farewells, in the show's one-year anniversary retrospective, on June 29, Episode 52, and later, met with fans and planned an August concert. Media reported viewers' mixed reactions to the cast changes, in particular, from a fan club of Russian representative Belyakov, and opinions that the cast was already doing well, with Belyakov and Quintart's contributions especially noted.

The new cast announced on July 1, 2015, included Samy Rashad El-Baz from Egypt, a graduate student in Korean language and literature at Seoul National University and a previous intern who appeared on Episode 11; and first time to appear: Przemysław Krompiec, Poland (Chung-Ang University doctoral student and model), Carlos Gorito, Brazil (Education Advisor at the Embassy of Brazil in Seoul; Science and Technology Section and Academic Exchange Programs), Nikolai Johnsen, Norway (graduate student in international studies at Korea University), Andreas Varsakopoulos, Greece (UMass Boston M.A. in applied linguistics, high school English teacher in Cheongju) and Yuta Nakamoto, Japan (a K-pop idol trainee with SM Rookies).

In September 2015, Director Kim Hee-jung announced the show would be adding more diversity by scheduling appearances with new "visiting intern" representatives, including those already invited from Thailand and Mexico.

At the end of December 2015, Japanese representative Nakamoto left the show after Episode 78 to prepare for his debut as a singer with his contracted company, S.M. Entertainment.

=== 2016 ===
In the beginning of June 2016, media announced cast (and production) changes expected for Episode 103, with nine members leaving - Zhang, Rasch and Okyere, (on the show from Episode 1), Lindemann (joined on Episode 5) and Krompiec, Gorito, Johnsen, Rashad El Baz and Varsakopoulos (joined on Episode 53). One reviewer said the show would have trouble finding a substitute for the consistently intelligent level of discussion Rasch had brought to the show.

Episode 103 began with a reorganization of nine representatives which included two remaining members Patry and Mondi. They were joined by new members: Mark Tetto (United States), (B.S. chemistry Princeton University, MBus Wharton, Chief Financial Officer Vingle), a prior intern on Episode 24, and first time to appear: "Lucky" Abhishek Gupta (India), (CEO agriculture importing company), Zahid Hussain (Pakistan), (B.S. electrical engineering Korea University, M.B.A. Sungkyunkwan University, Project Manager CK Solar Co.), Mao Yifeng (China), (studied Chonnam National University, Executive at wedding planning company and DJ), Aurelien Loubert (France), (French instructor at Hankuk University of Foreign Studies), Alex Mazzucchelli (Switzerland) (B.S. economics University of Essex, M.S. international business economics City University London, Strategy Manager Enso Group), and Niklas Klabunde (Germany) (East Asian studies Heidelberg University, model).

After the new cast were introduced on Episode 103, subsequent episodes no longer previewed starring cast members. After Episode 105, three additional visiting intern/representatives were added as recurring cast, Christian Burgos (Mexico), (video producer), previously on Episode 68 and newer interns, Ogi Hitoshi (Japan), (Keio University graduate, animation company emoticon designer), and Wang Xinlin (China), (Dalian Jiaotong University electrical engineering graduate, Seoul National University mechanical engineering doctoral student).

On July 22, 2016, Mondi responded about the cast changes and he and Patry being the two selected to stay, "There were so many other members who speak better Korean than us....and there were other members who were funnier." About the changed atmosphere, he said, "Since different people are on, a new kind of Non-Summit may appear."

In late August 2016, Chinese representative Mao Yifeng, who appeared on Episodes 103 and 104, was deleted from the show's cast list and promotional posters.

=== 2017 ===
On the 144th episode it was announced that India representative Lucky Abhishek Gupta would leave the show due to personal business.

== List of episodes, topics and guests ==
=== Season 1 (first part) ===
==== 2014 ====
Topics and guests (episode 1-26)

Ep. #	Date	Topic	Guest representative(s)	Guest country of origin
1	July 7	Independence from parents	Jang Dong-min	(South Korea)
2	July 14	Pre-marital co-habitation	Jung So-ra, Lee Guk-joo	(South Korea) , (South Korea)
3	July 21	Career pursuit	Shin Hae-chul	(South Korea)
4	July 28	Dating	Oh Na-mi, Soyou	(South Korea) , (South Korea)
5	August 4	Compulsory sex education	Skull, Haha	(South Korea) , (South Korea)
6	August 11	Interpersonal relationships	Jo Se-ho	(South Korea)
7	August 18	Marriage	Ahn Young-mi, Hong Seok-cheon	(South Korea) , (South Korea)
8	August 25	Seoul living	Yook Joong-wan, Kang Joon-woo	(South Korea) , (South Korea)
9	September 1	Raising children	Kim Gu-ra	(South Korea)
10	September 8	Chuseok special	Sam Hammington	(Australia)
11	September 15	Job application requirements	John Park	(United States)
12	September 22	Internet/Smartphone usage	Jo Kwon	(South Korea)
13	September 29	Spending money on friends	Yoo Sang-moo	(South Korea)
14	October 6	Maintaining good health	Lee Yoon-suk	(South Korea)
15	October 13	Parenting	Park Ji-yoon	(South Korea)
16	October 20	Korean and foreign languages	Chang Kiha	(South Korea)
17	October 27	Dreams and happiness	Kim Sung-kyun	(South Korea)
18	November 3	Break-ups, divorce	Gong Hyung-jin	(South Korea)
19	November 10	Love, romance problems	Jang Yoon-ju	(South Korea)
20	November 17	Generation gap	Eunhyuk, Kyuhyun	(South Korea) , (South Korea)
21	November 24	The bond of brothers	Kim Bum-soo	(South Korea)
22	December 1	Sexism	Bobby Kim, Sayuri Fujita	(South Korea) , (Japan)
23	December 8	Crime and Safety	Kangin, Zhou Mi	(South Korea) , (China)
24	December 15	Entrepreneurship	Lee Sang-min	(South Korea)
25	December 22	Christmas special	Yoon Min-soo, Ryu Jae-hyun	(South Korea) , (South Korea)
26	December 29	Year end special		

==== 2015 ====
Topics and guests (episode 27-78)

Ep.#	Date	Topic	Guest representative(s)	Guest country of origin
27	January 5	Philanthropy	Sean Noh	(South Korea)
28	January 12	Private education	Kim Kwan	(South Korea)
29	January 19	Anger and rage	Park Chul-min	(South Korea)
30	January 26	Noblesse oblige and corruption	Seo Jang-hoon	(South Korea)
31	February 2	Study abroad and immigration	Kang Yong-suk	(South Korea)
32	February 9	Lies and rumors	Kangnam	(Japan)
33	February 16	James Hooper special update	James Hooper	(United Kingdom)
34	February 23	Retirement plans	Kim Kwang-kyu	(South Korea)
35	March 2	Fashion trends	Moon Hee-joon	(South Korea)
36	March 9	Midlife crisis	Yoon Do-hyun	(South Korea)
37	March 16	Wealth	Hong Jin-ho, Kang Kyun-sung	(South Korea) , (South Korea)
38	March 23	Television	Jo Young-nam	(South Korea)
39	March 30	New academic term	Kim So-yeon	(South Korea)
40	April 6	Food and eating	Kim Tae-woo	(South Korea)
41	April 13	Conscience and morality	Baek Ji-young	(South Korea)
42	April 20	Lookism	Kim Jun-hyun	(South Korea)
43	April 27	Gifted education	Jang Jin	(South Korea)
44	May 4	Jobs	Huh Young-man	(South Korea)
45	May 11	House owning	Song Eun-i, Kim Sook	(South Korea) , (South Korea)
46	May 18	Hate speech and hate crime	Chin Jung-kwon	(South Korea)
47	May 25	Leadership	Onew, Choi Min-ho	(South Korea) , (South Korea)
48	June 1	Laughter and happiness	Kim Young-chul	(South Korea)
49	June 8	Law	Robert Holley	(South Korea)
50	June 15	Value of age	Jo Min-ki	(South Korea)
51	June 22	War and Peace	Chin Jung-kwon	(South Korea)
52	June 29	1st Anniversary Special		
53	July 6	Good countries to live	Hwang Kwanghee	(South Korea)
54	July 13	MERS Crisis in South Korea	Hwang Seok-jeong	(South Korea)
55	July 20	Desire	Im Won-hee, Son Ho-jun	(South Korea) , (South Korea)
56	July 27	Correct answer	Lee Hoon	(South Korea)
57	August 3	World economy, Greek financial crisis	Choi Jin-ki	(South Korea)
58	August 10	Dangers of science and technology	Joon Park	(United States)
59	August 17	Gender role	Hong Jin-kyung	(South Korea)
60	August 24	Multiculturalism	Jeong Jun-ha	(South Korea)
61	August 31	Decision-making	Jang Do-yeon	(South Korea)
62	September 7	National psyche and country development	Heo Kyung-hwan	(South Korea)
63	September 14	Environmental protection	Yenny, Hyelim	(South Korea) , (South Korea)
64	September 21	Working vs. getting education	Beenzino	(South Korea)
65	September 28	Chuseok Special		
66	October 5	Ill-fated relationships	Park Mi-sun	(South Korea)
67	October 12	Creativity	Ha Sang-wook	(South Korea)
68	October 19	Importance of eating breakfast	Sam Kim	(South Korea)
69	October 26	Miscommunication between men and women	Jo Jung-chi, Jung-in	(South Korea) , (South Korea)
70	November 2	A world without crime	Pyo Chang-won	(South Korea)
71	November 9	Social polarization	Hwang Chi-yeul	(South Korea)
72	November 16	Personal privacy and privacy law	Eun Ji-won	(South Korea)
73	November 23	Part-time work impeding career advancement	Lee Hong-gi	(South Korea)
74	November 30	Boasting	Park Na-rae	(South Korea)
75	December 7	War on terror	Chin Jung-kwon, Robin Deiana	(South Korea) (France)
76	December 14	Making a good first impression	Woo Hyeon	(South Korea)
77	December 21	Legendary music	Bae Cheol-soo	(South Korea)
78	December 28	2015 top global issues	Jung Sang-hoon	(South Korea)

==== 2016 ====
Topics and guests (episode 79-102)

Ep.#	Date	Topic	Guest representative(s)	Guest country of origin
79	January 4	Utopia	Kim Jung-man	(South Korea)
80	January 11	Interest in politics	Na Kyung-won	(South Korea)
81	January 18	Love of pets	Han Ye-seul	(South Korea)
82	January 25	Personal branding	Rhyu Si-min	(South Korea)
83	February 1	Debt	Hwang Jae-geun	(South Korea)
84	February 8	Couple's holiday fighting	Kim Sook, Yoon Jung-soo	(South Korea) , (South Korea)
85	February 15	Real friendship	Jang Dong-min, Yu Sang-moo	(South Korea) , (South Korea)
86	February 22	Mainstream and non-mainstream	Lee Byeong-heon	(South Korea)
87	February 29	Children's life satisfaction	Kwon Oh-joong	(South Korea)
88	March 7	Planning for older age while young	Jonghyun, Taemin	(South Korea) , (South Korea)
89	March 14	The 3rd Hallyu	Yoon Sang-hyun	(South Korea)
90	March 21	Time management	Sandeul, Baro	(South Korea) , (South Korea)
91	March 28	Understanding people's behavior using data	Song Gil-young	(South Korea)
92	April 4	Neighbor problems	Ji Suk-jin	(South Korea)
93	April 11	Comparing yourself to others	Lee Chun-soo	(South Korea)
94	April 18	Wanting constant attention from others	Muzie, Lee Mal Nyeon	(South Korea) , (South Korea)
95	April 25	Minimalist lifestyle	Wheesung, K.Will	(South Korea) , (South Korea)
96	May 2	Conspiracy theories	Jung Eun-ji (Apink)	(South Korea)
97	May 9	Ageing gracefully (or not)	Youn Yuh-jung	(South Korea)
98	May 16	Syrian refugee crisis	Jung Woo-sung	(South Korea)
99	May 23	Natural disasters	Yoon Shi-yoon, Kwak Si-yang	(South Korea) , (South Korea)
100	May 30	100th Episode Special, Part 1	Prior cast: James Hooper, Julian Quintart, Robin Deiana, Takuya Terada, Ilya Belyakov, Blair Williams, Sujan Shakya	(South Korea) , etc.
101	June 6	100th Episode Special, Part 2	Prior cast: James Hooper, Julian Quintart, Robin Deiana, Takuya Terada, Ilya Belyakov, Blair Williams, Sujan Shakya	(South Korea) , etc.
102	June 13	Happiness	Kim Jaeduck, Tony An	(South Korea) , (South Korea)

=== Season 1 (second part, after reorganization) ===
==== 2016 ====
Topics and guests (episode 103-130)

Ep.#	Date	Topic	Guest representative(s)	Guest country of origin
103	June 20	Introduce new cast	—	—
104	June 27	Brexit / Working in a foreign country	Cao Lu	(China)
105	July 4	Sad songs	Yoon Jong-shin	(South Korea)
106	July 11	Nicknames	Min Kyung-hoon	(South Korea)
107	July 18	Recent ISIS attacks / Standards of beauty	Han Jin	(South Korea)
108	July 25	South China Sea dispute / Living with others	Han Ye-ri, Han Seung-yeon	(South Korea) , (South Korea)
109	August 1	Recent U.S. police shootings / Break from work	Tak Jae-hoon	(South Korea)
110	August 8	Conscription / Real and dream life	Sandara Park	(South Korea)
111	August 14	National Liberation Day of Korea special	Cho Seung-yeon	(South Korea)
112	August 22	Science fiction films / Organizing group ventures	Kim Joon-ho	(South Korea)
113	August 29	No kids zone / City life / On-site visit to Mark's Bukchon Hanok Village home	Kim Hyun-joo	(South Korea)
114	September 5	Eurojackpot / Solving cold cases	Yi Su-jeong	(South Korea)
115	September 12	Burkini/Burqa ban / The role of journalists	Ahn Na-kyung	(South Korea)
116	September 19	Duterte's war on drugs / Competition	Oh Ji-ho	(South Korea)
117	September 26	Drinking water / Modern mental illness	Horan (singer)	(South Korea)
118	October 3	Kim Young-ran Act / Wanting to be adult	MC Gree	(South Korea)
119	October 10	Charity / Colonization of Mars / Theatre, film attendance	Cho Jae-hyun	(South Korea)
120	October 17	Product recall / Single parent and non-traditional families	Kim Jung-eun	(South Korea)
121	October 24	Mitochondrial donation / Affairs	Song Ji-hyo	(South Korea)
122	October 31	Foreign real estate investment / Original restaurants, products	Kangta	(South Korea)
123	November 7	2016 United States presidential election / Collections, hobbies	Park Hae-jin	(South Korea)
124	November 14	US presidential election results / 2016 S. Korean & historical protests / Preparing for CSAT	Kang Sung-tae	(South Korea)
125	November 21	Black Friday / Emergency medicine	Namkoong In (physician, essayist)	(South Korea)
126	November 28	Pseudonyms / Audition, survivor TV shows	Zhou Jieqiong & Jeon So-mi (I.O.I)	(China) , (South Korea)
127	December 5	Bob Dylan's Nobel Prize in Literature / Expressing opinions frankly	Seo Yu-ri	(South Korea)
128	December 12	Fidel Castro's death / World's taboos	Kim Nam-gil, Moon Jeong-hee	(South Korea) , (South Korea)
129	December 19	Government hearings / Tobacco packaging warning messages / Single life culture	Lena Park	(South Korea)
130	December 26	Flight incidents/ Indian monetary reform / Extreme jobs	Park Jin-joo	(South Korea)

==== 2017 (ep. 131 – ep. 177) ====
Ep.#	Date	Topic	Guest representative(s)	Guest country of origin
131	January 9	The world in 2017	Cho Seung-yeon (2nd time)	(South Korea)
132	January 16	Interpol arrests / Ambulance costs / Late bloomers	Kim Min-kyo	(South Korea)
133	January 23	Barack Obama's farewell address / Organ donation / Trusting others & scams	Kim Jong-min	(South Korea)
134	January 30	Lunar New Year Special / Making good plans / Xinlin takes cast members on tour of Seoul	Kim Yong-man	(South Korea)
135	February 6	National turning points / Dieting	Seulgi & Wendy (Red Velvet)	(South Korea) (South Korea)
136	February 13	Trump's travel ban / Magic and supernatural powers	Lee Eun-gyeol	(South Korea)
137	February 20	Presidential families' privacy / Optimism	Cha Hong	(South Korea)
138	February 27	Kim Jong-nam assassination / School days	Lee Tae-il & Park Kyung (Block B)	(South Korea) , (South Korea)
139	March 6	Top jobs / Chelsea Manning commutation / Platonic love	Yoon Jin-seo	(South Korea)
140	March 13	Oscars political speeches / Globalizing Korean food	Hwang Kyo-ik (food columnist)	(South Korea)
141	March 20	Impeachment of Park Geun-hye / THAAD in South Korea / Living with nature	Choi Min-yong	(South Korea)
142	March 28	Shinzō Abe unpopularity and resignation / Striving to succeed	Jang Yun-jeong	(South Korea)
143	April 3	Air quality index ratings / Public broadcasting, stereotypes / Teamwork	Sojin & Yura (Girl's Day)	(South Korea) , (South Korea)
144	April 10	Cost of living ratings / Assault penalties / Family communication	Yoon Je-moon, Jung So-min	(South Korea) , (South Korea)
145	April 17	Best flower festivals / Equal pay for equal work / Black comedy & blacklisting	Yoo Byung-jae	(South Korea)
146	April 24	Work and family / Parental leave	Mickey Kim (Google APAC Director)	(South Korea)
147	May 1	Best airports / United Express Flight 3411 incident / Sleep	Kim Se-jeong & Kim Na-young (Gugudan)	(South Korea) , (South Korea)
148	May 8	2017 South Korean presidential election / Living for today or the future	Parc Jae-jung, Jang Jae-in	(South Korea) , (South Korea)
149	May 15	Pessimistic outlook / Adult education	Sohn Mina (travel writer), Sam Okyere	(South Korea) , (Ghana)
150	May 22	Students' satisfaction / Animals and pets	Yoon Park	(South Korea)
151	May 29	Insurance / Popular sports	Kim Yeon-koung	(South Korea)
152	June 5	Label / Dance	Hyoyeon, Minzy	(South Korea) , (South Korea)
153	June 12	Country leaders / Music is common world language	Sumi Jo	(South Korea)
154	June 19	Smartphone usage / Korean pop idol fandom culture	Son Na-eun & Park Cho-rong (Apink)	(South Korea) , (South Korea)
155	June 26	Communicating / Married or single life	Steven Yeun, Han Hye-yeon (designer)	(South Korea) / (United States) , (South Korea)
156	July 3	Best travel destinations / Finding a suitable career	Michael K. Lee, Ko Eun-sung (musical actor)	(United States) , (South Korea)
157	July 10	Mysterious stories / Looking too young	Seo Shin-ae	(South Korea)
158	July 17	Health and diseases	Hong Hye-geol & Yeo Esther (physicians, writers)	(South Korea) , (South Korea)
159	July 24	Popular museums / Personal relationships	Jung Yong-hwa	(South Korea)
160	July 31	Consumer boycotts / Child discipline	Ahn Jae-wook	(South Korea)
161	August 7	Abnormal weather / Urban legends & ghost stories	Kim Min-ah (JTBC weathercaster), Yum Jung-ah	(South Korea) , (South Korea)
162	August 14	Pets / Food of the future	Yu Min-sang & Kim Jun-hyun (comedians)	(South Korea) , (South Korea)
163	August 21	The world of literature	Kim Young-ha	(South Korea)
164	August 28	2017 North Korea crisis / Making a film	Lee Sang-bok (JTBC political reporter and host of Political Desk), Luc Besson	(South Korea) , (France)
165	September 4	Regulating fake news / Legislature arbitration	Chung Sye-kyun	(South Korea)
166	September 11	Tax policies / Infotainment	Jo Woo-jong (broadcaster), Kang Ji-young (JTBC announcer)	(South Korea) , (South Korea)
167	September 18	Mental health / Working after retirement	Yang Jae-woong (psychiatrist), Kang Sue-jin	(South Korea) , (South Korea)
168	September 25	Special Chuseok travel show with cast members Loubert & Ogi (with brothers & nephew)	Jun Hyun-moo & Yoo Se-yoon (show hosts)	(South Korea) , (South Korea)
169	October 9	Languages and alphabets	Cho Seung-yeon (3rd time)	(South Korea)
170	October 16	Autumn leaf color / Wedding songs	K.Will (2nd time)	(South Korea)
171	October 23	Misdemeanors / Life and death	Sung Ji-ru, Jeon Mi-seon	(South Korea) , (South Korea)
172	October 30	UNESCO and United Nations issues / Fashion	Minho & Taemin (SHINee) (2nd time)	(South Korea) , (South Korea)
173	November 6	Catalonia independence / Energy conservation	Ko Ji-yong	(South Korea)
174	November 13	Drinking culture / Emotional labor	Park Hye-jin (broadcaster)	(South Korea)
175	November 20	State visits / Nostalgia and memory	Jang Hang-jun, Kim Mu-yeol	(South Korea) , (South Korea)
176	November 27	Holiday charitable donations and acts / Children's education	Shin-Soo Choo	(South Korea)
177	December 4	Sailing around the world / Retrospective for show's hiatus	Kim Seung-jin (documentary film producer, sailor)	(South Korea)

== Episode firsts ==
Outdoor filming
In September 2015, the show announced that the episode 65, September 28 Chuseok Special would be the first outdoor filming for the show, to take place in a traditional hanok house in Gyeonggi Province with the cast dressed in holiday hanbok and celebrating with traditional games and foods of the world. Again, on August 29, 2016, part of episode 113 was filmed at representative Mark Tetto's hanok home in Bukchon Hanok Village, with some of the cast.
V-app fan meeting
On October 5, 2015, cast members met with fans on South Korea's Naver V-app for the first time, just prior to the airing of episode 66, with Patry, Mondi, Zhang and Lindemann introducing the Thai intern. And again on November 30, 2015, on episode 74, Yoo, Patry, Zhang, Krompiec introduced the Cambodian intern.
Female interns
On July 18, 2016, episode 107, the fifth show of Season Two, included the first two female interns as guests, Adela Borowiak from Poland and Najafizadeh Sudeh from Iran.
Hollywood actor intern/guest
On August 22, 2016, episode 112, England's Simon Pegg, the first Hollywood actor, appeared as an "intern/representative" on the show.
Minor age guest
On October 3, 2016, 17-year-old rapper, and television personality MC Gree, the show's first minor guest, discussed wanting to be an adult on Episode 118.
Out of country filming
On September 25, 2017, episode 168 was a special Chuseok travel show with hosts Jun and Yoo meeting brothers of cast members Loubert and Ogi in Tokyo and Kurashiki, Japan, respectively.

== Spin-off ==
=== Where Is My Friend's Home ===
On February 7, 2015, JTBC aired a new reality television-travel show Where Is My Friend's Home where the same cast and presenters visit the various countries of the foreign representatives.

== Reception ==
=== Media and ratings ===
In August 2014, Star News accounted the successful reception of the show to the majority of the foreign panel already knowing about Korea's cultural experiences and history. This enabled Korean audiences to have the chance to think more of Korea itself.

Episode 10 received the show's highest national viewership rating, to date, by Nielsen Korea, of 6%. Episode 11 ratings rose to 6.8% and exceeded the previous high.

On July 7, 2015, a The Korea Herald reviewer of the show's first airing of six new cast members, complimented them for having a serious political debate on issues like the Greek financial crisis, Sino-Norwegian relations and the history of Japanese nationalism; saying they demonstrated "a seasoned maturity and the potential for a significant impact beyond simple entertainment."

On November 17, 2017, as the show prepared to go on hiatus after Episode 177, Korea JoongAng Daily reporter Hong You-kyoung said, "The show's ratings have remained steady, at about 3 percent, which is relatively high for a program on a cable channel".

=== Original cast popularity ===
Due to the show's popularity, some of the panelists also appeared on other shows, Enes Kaya on Magic Eye, Enes Kaya and Julian Quintart on JTBC's Hidden Singer, Tyler Rasch was a surprise guest on "Arguments," another JTBC talk show about current affairs, and Sam Okyere and Enes Kaya were on the Happy Together "Hot People Special." Some appeared in fashion magazines, including Woman Sense, Star, Ceci, Allure, Arena, Grazia, and Ize. Also, due to his appearances on the show, Julian Quintart's musical group, Yann & Julian, was invited to perform at Global Gathering Korea on October 4, 2014. Julian Quintart, Enes Kaya, and Daniel Snoeks appeared in skits on Saturday Night Live Korea. Daniel Snoeks acted in a music video for kpop girl group AOA and Takuya Terada in Hyorin and Joo Young's music video. On November 13, 2014, Takuya Terada, Enes Kaya, Julian Quintart and show host Jun Hyun-moo all appeared as MCs and award presenters on the MelOn Music Awards at Seoul's Olympic Park Gymnastics Stadium. And some of the panelists were retained for commercial endorsements and advertisements, Julian Quintart, Sam Okyere, Robin Deiana and Daniel Snoeks; although Tyler Rasch and Zhang Yuan had their commercial activities limited by the Ministry of Justice, after problems with their visa's were worked out by JTBC.

By the end of May 2015, the cast were still benefiting from the show's popularity. Zhang had signed on as an entertainer with SM C&C, and Mondi, Lindemann and Patry were contracted with a management agency, Dramahouse and J Contents Hub, founded by JTBC. Several continued to be cast on variety shows, including Okyere on Real Men 2, and Rasch on Hot Brain: Problematic Men. Terada starred in his first Korean drama The Lover, Quintart had a cameo in another K-drama A Girl Who Sees Smells, and Deiana's rapping was featured on Sosim Boys' "Shining Star" and Crayon Pop's "What Are You Doing?"

=== Impact and social responsibility ===
==== 2014 ====
One of the original cast members, Daniel Snoeks, whose hands and much of his body were tattooed, and his appearance on the show, was said to contribute to "the cause" of tattoo artists in South Korea, where injecting ink into the skin can only be done legally by qualified doctors, despite the "growing fashion trend." Snoeks said people encountering him on the subway used to move away and comment that his tattoos were "disgusting" or "scary" and after he appeared on the show, people wanted to take pictures with him.

In September, KOCCA said the show "runs a fierce debate on Korean culture" and "their speeches frequently become a hot issue among young viewers, sometimes for being too radical and sometimes too conservative. However, viewers can at least think of both sides of opinions." KOCCA credits the show for not just including "white people from advanced countries" that Koreans are already familiar with, but also inviting guests from diverse countries with varied cultures.

In October, Korea.net said the show debates on a wide range of current affairs, with topics that are "sympathetic issues for most people," and the non-Korean panelists, in their adopted home from four to fifteen years, give opinions on things Korean, with answers so stereotypically "Korean," that it makes viewers laugh. The article adds that more TV shows are adding non-Koreans and viewers are responding positively to the "fun" and "genuine" perspectives they bring to the shows, and accounting the appeal to a growing international audience of non-Korean youths. The article further poses that this casting trend reflects a Korean society which is being affected by the influences of globalization, and starting to welcome interactions and communication with non-Koreans, accepting them as true members of the community, and, as a result, bringing new energy to a Korean society that once prided itself on being "a nation with one single ethnicity."

In November, Yale University's YaleGlobal Online, published by the MacMillan Center, that "explores the implications of the growing interconnectedness of the world," republished an article from The Straits Times, with a commentary. They said, "South Korean television stardom is no longer the exclusive domain of Korean nationals. The emergence of foreign stars on Korean television programs draws international attention to South Korea's entertainment and media industries. Hailing from Australia, France, Ghana, the United States and other countries, foreign stars are breaking down barriers in Korean TV...The actors also serve as cultural ambassadors for their home countries and can find themselves deconstructing stereotypes about other parts of the world. Ghanaian actor Sam Okyere states that his television character helps generate more nuanced perspectives on Africa." The Straits Times article, which interviewed Okyere, stated that the "chatty Okyere has snagged a regular gig...on new talk show Abnormal Summit on Korean cable network JTBC," and said that Okyere "recalls earlier appearances where he was on the receiving end of jokes about his African heritage," adding that he hopes to do his part as a "black representative" and create awareness about his home country and adopted home South Korea.

On December 1, one million copies of a show calendar sold out within four minutes of release online. Donations were given to the Beautiful Store, whose chairman Myunghee Hong visited the set on January 11, 2015, for a ceremony with cast. Also in December, Seoul Mayor Park Won-soon was "inspired by popular TV show Abnormal Summit on cable channel JTBC" and scheduled an "informal round-table meeting" with ten foreign residents for February 2015. Called a "Seoul-style Non-summit", the forum was planned for international residents to share their experiences, including inconveniences in daily living in Seoul, in an open and "frank" talk with the Mayor.

==== 2015 ====
On March 10, the Seoul Metropolitan Government appointed Julian Quintart and Robin Deiana, two "foreign entertainers" who "gained popularity after appearing on cable network JTBC talk show Non-Summit," as honorary ambassadors for the ICLEI world congress global network meeting of over 1,000 cities, which is committed to building a sustainable future, and took place at Seoul's Dongdaemun Design Plaza and Seoul Plaza from April 8–12. Also in April, Tyler Rasch and Ilya Belyakov, Honorary Culture Sharing Ambassadors of the Korea Foundation, attended a ceremony for the new "Koreans and Foreigners Together" program. Sujan Shakya, having hosted his country, Nepal, in April, on the spin-off Where Is My Friend's Home, became an active spokesperson for JTBC and his alma mater Dankook University for outreach following the April 2015 Nepal earthquake and the May 2015 Nepal earthquake, along with intern Mark Tetto.

In September, Mondi joined ex-members Hooper and Shakya for the "One Mile Closer" charity cycling tour, led by Hooper.

On November 29, Quintart, Belyakov and Shakya participated in the "Global Friendship Festival" organized by a foreign students' group at KBS Sports World. Also in November, Belyakov became a contributing columnist for Korea.net.

On December 7, Deiana returned to the show as one of the guests to discuss terrorism in his home country France. On December 14, the Asia-Pacific Centre of Education for International Understanding (APCEIU) published interviews of Shakya and Varsakopoulos about cultural diversity and their respective countries. A Muslim cast member, Samy Rashad El-Baz, wrote a December 24 editorial for JTBC's affiliated newspaper, JoongAng Ilbo, where other cast members have contributed anecdotal and cultural perspectives since the show's debut. In the article, and in a follow-up Internet show with more cast members and JoongAng Ilbo editorial staff, Rashad El-baz discussed the Islam religion, terrorism and Islamophobia. Also in December, twelve cast members continued the show's charity work with a fan-connected V-app event at Sinchon's Tom N Toms, with contributions going to JoongAng Ilbo's jointly funded welfare program for low-income children, We Start.

==== 2016 ====
On January 12, representatives Guillaume Patry, Alberto Mondi, Zhang Yuan and Tyler Rasch, along with Psy and violinist Clara-Jumi Kang, received the Corea Image Communication Institute awards, for "introducing Korean culture to the rest of the world through a unique perspective and interesting debate." In January, Daniel Lindemann and Sam Okyere became part of an international cast of the KBS2 K-drama Moorim School, with a plot based on a "mystical martial-arts high school" and an appeal as a "global youth action drama". Lindemann and Okyere were staff at the school, which "was built to protect and uphold world peace". Also, through January, prior cast members Hooper, Deiana, Terada, Williams, Shakya and former intern Tetto were part of the travel reality show Where Is My Friend's Home visiting some of their home countries.

On February 12, cast members Alberto Mondi, Sam Okyere and Nikolai Johnsen joined the "K-Smile" campaign, part of the Ministry of Culture, Sports and Tourism's tourism promotion in Myeong-dong to support the "2016–2018 Visit Korea Year" and the "Korea Grand Sale."

On March 19, eight cast members participated in the 2016 Earth Hour campaign as celebrity supporters. Also on that date, intern Tetto, a member of the Korea Legacy Committee that helps poverty-stricken elderly Koreans, participated in their White Day fund-raiser for contributions to the Seoul Senior Welfare Center.

On April 22, Quintart and Ha Ji-won, president of the Green Education Institutions and director of the National Assembly Forum on Climate Change, received awards for their contributions as goodwill ambassadors for climate change, at a joint Earth Day and Paris Agreement celebration hosted by the European Union delegation to Korea. Also in April, Rasch was chosen as the WWF-Korea Brand Ambassador, and on April 24, ran in Korea's 50k, to help raise funds for Operation Smile.

In May, present and former cast members Patry, Rasch, Deiana, Johnsen, Williams, Terada and Okyere appeared at a premiere event for an upcoming movie Canola;

On July 12, Mondi and Tetto spoke on a panel "Korean Wave 3.0" along with Professor Seo Kyoung-duk and comedian Seo Kyung-seok, at the 8th World Korean Educators Conference hosted by the King Sejong Institute at the National Museum of Korea. On July 14, Carlos Gorito was named Gangwon Province honorary ambassador and set to promote Pyeongchang 2018 at Brazil's Rio 2016.

In September, Tetto was selected as Ambassador for the 9th Annual Senior Film Festival, an October event sponsored by the Seoul Senior Welfare Center.

== Ratings ==
In the ratings below, the highest rating for the show is in red, and the lowest rating for the show is in blue each year.

=== 2014 ===
List of ratings (episode 1–26)
- Ratings released by AGB Nielsen Korean and TnMS.

Ep. #	Original Airdate	AGB Ratings	
Ep. #	Original Airdate	Nationwide	Seoul Capital Area
01	July 7	1.553%	1.8%
02	July 14	1.983%	2.4%
03	July 21	2.613%	3.3%
04	July 28	2.295%	
05	August 4	3.026%	4%
06	August 11	3.548%	4.4%
07	August 18	4.089%	5.3%
08	August 25	4.304%	
09	September 1	3.842%	
10	September 8	4.864%	6%
11	September 15	4.964%	6.8%
12	September 22	4.501%	
13	September 29	4.779%	
14	October 6	4.349%	
15	October 13	4.060%	
16	October 20	4.403%	
17	October 27	5.410%	
18	November 3	4.631%	
19	November 10	4.0%	
20	November 17	3.9%	
21	November 24	4.0%	
22	December 1	4.4%	
23	December 8	3.9%	
24	December 15	3.5%	
25	December 22	3.8%	
26	December 29	2.4%	

=== 2015 ===
List of ratings (episode 27–78)
- Ratings released by AGB Nielsen Korean.

Ep. #	Original Airdate	AGB Ratings	
Ep. #	Original Airdate	Nationwide	Seoul Capital Area
27	January 5	4.2%	
28	January 12	3.8%	
29	January 19	4.5%	
30	January 26	4.4%	
31	February 2	4.3%	
32	February 9	4.7%	
33	February 16	5.5%	
34	February 23	5.2%	
35	March 2	4.0%	
36	March 9	4.1%	
37	March 16	4.5%	
38	March 23	4.1%	
39	March 30	4.1%	
40	April 6	4.0%	
41	April 13	3.4%	
42	April 20	4.2%	
43	April 27	3.4%	
44	May 4	3.2%	
45	May 11	3.3%	
46	May 18	3.2%	
47	May 25	3.8%	
48	June 1	3.7%	
49	June 8	3.7%	
50	June 15	3.7%	
51	June 22	4.2%	
52	June 29	3.3%	
53	July 6	4.7%	
54	July 13	4.0%	
55	July 20	3.8%	
56	July 27	4.0%	
57	August 3	3.8%	
58	August 10	4.0%	
59	August 17	3.9%	
60	August 24	3.7%	
61	August 31	4.3%	
62	September 7	3.7%	
63	September 14	3.7%	
64	September 21	3.2%	
65	September 28	2.8%	
66	October 5	3.2%	
67	October 12	3.4%	
68	October 19	3.5%	
69	October 26	2.7%	
70	November 2	4.5%	
71	November 9	3.4%	
72	November 16	3.4%	
73	November 23	3.8%	
74	November 30	3.9%	
75	December 7	3.6%	
76	December 14	3.8%	
77	December 21	4.0%	
78	December 28	3.5%	

=== 2016 ===
List of ratings (episode 79–130)
- Ratings released by AGB Nielsen Korean.

Ep. #	Original Airdate	AGB Ratings	
Ep. #	Original Airdate	Nationwide	Seoul Capital Area
79	January 4	4.1%	
80	January 11	3.3%	
81	January 18	3.5%	
82	January 25	3.3%	
83	February 1	3.2%	
84	February 8	3.5%	
85	February 15	3.5%	
86	February 22	2.9%	
87	February 29	3.4%	
88	March 7	3.1%	
89	March 14	3.3%	
90	March 21	3.4%	
91	March 28	3.3%	
92	April 4	2.9%	
93	April 11	2.8%	
94	April 18	2.5%	
95	April 25	2.6%	
96	May 2	2.7%	
97	May 9	3.4%	
98	May 16	3.4%	
99	May 23	3.2%	
100	May 30	2.9%	
101	June 6	2.3%	
102	June 13	2.5%	
103	June 20	3.1%	
104	June 27	3.0%	
105	July 4	2.7%	
106	July 11	2.4%	
107	July 18	3.1%	
108	July 25	2.8%	
109	August 1	3.4%	
110	August 8	2.8%	
111	August 15	3.2%	
112	August 22	2.9%	
113	August 29	3.3%	
114	September 5	3.5%	
115	September 12	3.1%	
116	September 19	2.9%	
117	September 26	3.0%	
118	October 3	2.9%	
119	October 10	2.5%	
120	October 17	2.9%	
121	October 24	2.9%	
122	October 31	2.9%	
123	November 7	3.1%	
124	November 14	3.3%	
125	November 21	3.3%	
126	November 28	3.4%	
127	December 5	3.2%	
128	December 12	3.1%	
129	December 19	3.3%	
130	December 26	2.9%	

=== 2017 ===
List of ratings (episode 131–177)
- Ratings released by AGB Nielsen Korean.

Ep. #	Original Airdate	AGB Ratings	
Ep. #	Original Airdate	Nationwide	Seoul Capital Area
131	January 9	3.7%	
132	January 16	3.0%	
133	January 23	3.3%	
134	January 30	3.1%	
135	February 6	3.5%	
136	February 13	3.5%	
137	February 20	3.5%	
138	February 20	3.4%	
139	February 27	2.7%	
140	March 13	3.4%	
141	March 20	3.7%	
142	March 27	3.2%	
143	April 3	3.2%	
144	April 10	3.6%	
145	April 17	3.4%	
146	April 24	3.6%	
147	May 1	3.7%	
148	May 8	3.4%	
149	May 15	3.4%	
150	May 22	2.9%	
151	May 29	3.0%	
152	June 5	3.9%	
153	June 12	4.2%	
154	June 19	3.4%	
155	June 26	3.7%	
156	July 3	3.5%	
157	July 10	3.2%	
158	July 17	3.2%	
159	July 24	2.8%	
160	July 31	3.2%	
161	August 7	3.2%	
162	August 14	3.5%	
163	August 21	3.5%	
164	August 28	3.9%	
165	September 4	2.6%	
166	September 11	2.8%	
167	September 18	2.8%	
168	September 25	3.1%	
169	October 9	3.6%	
170	October 16	2.7%	
171	October 23	3.2%	
172	October 31	2.4%	
173	November 6	2.7%	
174	November 13	3.1%	
175	November 20	3.0%	
176	November 20	3.1%	

== International versions ==
=== Turkish franchise ===
In 2014, ATV purchased the rights for a Turkish adaptation of the show, titled Elin Oğlu, which premiered on 21 March 2015.

=== Chinese franchises ===
In 2015, two Chinese adaptations of the show premiered.

Hubei Television produced Informal Talks which has aired from 24 April 2015 to present. Jiangsu Broadcasting Corporation produced A Bright World (世界青年说), which aired from 16 April 2015 to 13 April 2017.

Country	Name	Host(s)	Network	Date premiered
China	Informal Talks	Various	Hubei Television	24 April 2015 – present
China	A Bright World (世界青年说)	Peng Yu, Shen Ling, Liu Yan and Yu Shasha	Jiangsu Broadcasting Corporation	16 April 2015 – 13 April 2017
Turkey	Elin Oğlu	Burcu Esmersoy (2015–2016); Ömür Varol (2015); Sinan Çalışkanoğlu (2015–2016)	ATV	21 March 2015 – 7 May 2016

== Awards and nominations ==
List of Awards and nominations (2014-2017)

Year	Award	Category	Recipients and nominees	Result
2015	51st Baeksang Arts Awards	Best Entertainment Program	Non-Summit	Won
2015	51st Baeksang Arts Awards	Best Male Variety Performer	Jun Hyun-moo (Non-Summit, I Live Alone)	Won
2017	Korea Communications Commission Broadcasting Awards	Diversity Award	Non-Summit	Won
