= Sujan Shakya =

Korean television personality from Nepal (born 1988)

Sujan Ratna Shakya
- Born: 10 March 1988 (age 37); Kathmandu, Nepal
- Occupation: Television personality
- Years active: 2015–present
- Website: Sujan Shakya on Instagram

Sujan Ratna Shakya (Nepali: सुजन रत्न शाक्य; born 10 March 1988) is a Nepalese television personality based in South Korea. He was a cast member in the talk show Non-Summit and reality-travel show Where Is My Friend's Home.

== Personal ==
Shakya is from Kathmandu Nepal. He arrived in Korea in 2010 to study urban planning at Dankook University, where he graduated, and is a Sales and Marketing Manager of a parachute products company in Seoul where he has worked for over five years.

== Career ==
On 5 January 2015 he interned as a guest representative from his home country Nepal, on Episode 27 of the JTBC South Korean talk show Non-Summit, that is made of a cast of young men from different countries, living in Seoul, who debate and discuss issues, in the Korean language, with perspectives they bring from their various cultures, from their native countries. He was immediately selected to be a permanent cast member for the next episode on 12 January, and joined, along with two more previous guest interns from Russia and Australia. In a taped video, as to his expectations for his appearance on the show, he said he felt awkward, but would try his best, and hoped to bring awareness to Nepal and teach others about his country

On the show, Shakya responds to questions about his country and religion, in one instance, as presented by the show's host Sung Si-kyung, that 90 percent of the people of Nepal are Hindu and revere the "cow" animal, with fellow talk show member Guillaume Patry, from Canada, responding with a joke, that he likes "beef". In discussions about an "angry society," he said rather than getting mad, people suppress anger by doing yoga. Another time he discussed the pace of life in Nepal as compared to the city life in Seoul.

In March 2015, after participation on Non-Summit, he became part of the cast of the spin-off reality and travel show Where Is My Friend's Home, for a visit to the country of Belgium, with other cast members, on their second country's visit.

In April 2015, he hosted the trip to Nepal, the third country visited by Where Is My Friend's Home. While filming there, he said, "I hope people remember Nepal as a beautiful country of mountains," and "I wanted to show Nepal’s traditional culture where gods and humans exist together." He said he was happy to visit family and friends he hadn't seen in over a year and a half.

During the broadcasting of pre-recorded episodes of My Friend's Home, the April 2015 Nepal earthquake occurred on the same day that the second episode of the Nepal trips aired, on 25 April 2015. He was interviewed and said that his family was fine and the family home had not collapsed. He posted a poem and the message "#prayforNepal" on his Twitter account.

== Filmography ==
=== Television series ===
Year	Title	Network	Role	Notes
2015	Non-Summit	JTBC	Himself	cast member
2015	Where Is My Friend's Home	JTBC	Himself	cast member
