= Mihal Ashminov =

Bulgarian celebrity chef

Mikhal Ashminov
- Born: March 27, 1982 (age 44); Bulgaria

Mihal Spasov Ashminov (Bulgarian: Михал Спасов Ашминов; born March 27, 1982) is a Bulgarian celebrity chef working in South Korea. He is master chef of Bulgarian restaurant Zelen in Yongin, and was one of the chefs participating in the variety show Please Take Care of My Refrigerator.

== Personal ==
Born to a Bulgarian father and a Polish mother in Sofia, the capital of Bulgaria, Ashminov worked at the Sheraton Hotel Balkan in Sofia before being transferred to a hotel in Seoul, where he opened his own restaurant and eventually got cast in Please Take Care of My Refrigerator.

== Filmography ==
=== Television ===
Year	Title	Role	Network	Notes
2014–2019	Please Take Care of My Refrigerator	Cast member	JTBC	
2015–2016	Where Is My Friend's Home	Himself	JTBC	Episodes 38–44, 51–58
2017	Let's Eat Dinner Together	Guest	JTBC	Episode 31
2018	What's Wrong with Secretary Kim	Himself	tvN	Episode 9
2018	Soo-mi's Side Dishes	Cast member	tvN	
2020	King of Mask Singer	Contestant	MBC	as "Golden Bell" (episode 285)
