= Where Is My Friend's Home =

2015–2016 South Korean TV series

- Logo
- Also known as: Where Is My Friend's House; My Friend's Home
- Hangul: 내 친구의 집은 어디인가
- RR: Nae chinguui jibeun eodiinga
- MR: Nae ch'in'guŭi chibŭn ŏdiin'ga
- Genre: Reality television-travel show
- Written by: Choi Hye-jung, Jang Yoon-hee, Park Seo-jin, Lee Kyung-hee, Kim Jeong-won, Kim Ha-woon
- Directed by: Kim Hak-min, Kim Sol, Ahn Jeong-hyun
- Country of origin: South Korea
- Original language: Korean
- No. of seasons: 1
- No. of episodes: 62 (list of episodes)

Production
- Executive producer: Bang Hyun-young
- Production locations: South Korea; China; Belgium; Nepal; Italy; Canada; Australia; France; Germany; New Zealand; Thailand; United States
- Running time: 70 minutes per episode

Original release
- Network: JTBC
- Release: February 7, 2015 – April 29, 2016

Where Is My Friend's Home (Korean: 내 친구의 집은 어디인가) is a television show on JTBC in South Korea which features the cast members of another JTBC show, Non-Summit, as they visit the home countries of the Non-Summit non-Korean members and their friends. The show is in a reality television-travel show format, in the Korean language, and first aired on February 7, 2015. Season 1 ended on April 29, 2016, after completing eleven trips to foreign countries and two trips within South Korea. The show was released on Netflix as The Homecoming.

== Background ==
The show follows South Korean and foreign cast members of the South Korean television Non-Summit as they experience cultures of various countries through homestay, meeting the locals, and experiencing a better understanding of multiculturalism.

The show, a spin-off of Non-Summit, is less formal, with the cast from the original talkshow panel, now relaxing casually, as "friends", to visit one another's homes. The humor continues; the teaser video for the first episode, a trip to China, was entitled "Steal Things in Zhang Yuan's House". The show's posters, entitled "Global friend's house attack project", showed some of the cast's casual activities, like eating ice cream and jogging.

And although somewhat like a travel show, producers said Where is My Friend's Home trips would "not be typical." The show also candidly addresses common misperceptions and prejudices about the countries visited.

== Season 1 ==
=== Cast ===
Through the fourth trip, the cast was made up entirely of Non-Summit cast members, current and past. After that, some new cast members were added, including South Korean television personalities and K-pop idols; who, in some cases, played host in their respective countries, augmenting the list of foreign cast members and countries visited. The first instance was the fifth trip to Canada which visited Henry Lau's home in Toronto, as well as Non-Summit cast member Guillaume Patry's home in Quebec.

=== Chart of countries visited and cast ===
Visited country
01	China	02	Belgium	03	Nepal	04	Italy	05	Canada
06	South Korea (Buyeo County)	07	Australia	08	France	09	Germany	10	New Zealand
11	South Korea (Jeju Island)	12	Thailand	13	United States				

Nation	Name	Visited country												
Nation	Name	01	02	03	04	05	06	07	08	09	10	11	12	13
South Korea	Yoo Se-yoon	✔	✔	✔	✔	✔	✔	✔	—N/a	✔	—N/a	✔	✔	✔
China	Zhang Yuan	✔	✔	✔	✔	✔	✔	✔	✔	✔	✔	✔	—N/a	—N/a
Italy	Alberto Mondi	✔	✔	✔	✔	—N/a	✔	✔	✔	✔	—N/a	✔	✔	—N/a
Canada	Guillaume Patry	✔	✔	—N/a	—N/a	✔	✔	—N/a	✔	—N/a	✔	✔	—N/a	✔
Belgium	Julian Quintart	✔	✔	—N/a	—N/a	—N/a	—N/a	—N/a	—N/a	—N/a	—N/a	—N/a	—N/a	—N/a
United States	Tyler Rasch	✔	✔	—N/a	—N/a	—N/a	✔	—N/a	—N/a	—N/a	—N/a	—N/a	—N/a	✔
Nepal	Sujan Shakya	—N/a	✔	✔	—N/a	✔	—N/a	—N/a	—N/a	—N/a	✔	—N/a	—N/a	—N/a
Germany	Daniel Lindemann	—N/a	—N/a	✔	✔	—N/a	✔	✔	—N/a	✔	—N/a	—N/a	—N/a	—N/a
United Kingdom	James Hooper	—N/a	—N/a	✔	✔	—N/a	—N/a	✔	—N/a	—N/a	—N/a	—N/a	—N/a	—N/a
United States	Mark Tetto	—N/a	—N/a	✔	✔	—N/a	—N/a	—N/a	✔	—N/a	—N/a	—N/a	—N/a	—N/a
France	Robin Deiana	—N/a	—N/a	—N/a	✔	—N/a	—N/a	—N/a	✔	—N/a	—N/a	—N/a	—N/a	—N/a
Canada	Henry Lau	—N/a	—N/a	—N/a	—N/a	✔	—N/a	—N/a	—N/a	—N/a	—N/a	—N/a	—N/a	—N/a
New Zealand	John Riley	—N/a	—N/a	—N/a	—N/a	✔	—N/a	—N/a	—N/a	—N/a	✔	✔	—N/a	—N/a
South Korea	Jun Hyun-moo	—N/a	—N/a	—N/a	—N/a	—N/a	✔	—N/a	—N/a	—N/a	—N/a	—N/a	—N/a	—N/a
South Korea	Yoo Hong-jun	—N/a	—N/a	—N/a	—N/a	—N/a	✔	—N/a	—N/a	—N/a	—N/a	—N/a	—N/a	—N/a
Australia	Blair Williams	—N/a	—N/a	—N/a	—N/a	—N/a	✔	✔	—N/a	✔	—N/a	—N/a	—N/a	—N/a
Japan	Takuya Terada	—N/a	—N/a	—N/a	—N/a	—N/a	—N/a	✔	—N/a	—N/a	✔	—N/a	—N/a	—N/a
Ghana	Sam Okyere	—N/a	—N/a	—N/a	—N/a	—N/a	—N/a	—N/a	✔	✔	—N/a	—N/a	—N/a	—N/a
Bulgaria	Mihal Ashminov	—N/a	—N/a	—N/a	—N/a	—N/a	—N/a	—N/a	—N/a	✔	—N/a	✔	✔	—N/a
South Korea	Lee Jung	—N/a	—N/a	—N/a	—N/a	—N/a	—N/a	—N/a	—N/a	—N/a	✔	✔	—N/a	—N/a
South Korea	Jang Dong-min	—N/a	—N/a	—N/a	—N/a	—N/a	—N/a	—N/a	—N/a	—N/a	—N/a	✔	—N/a	—N/a
Thailand	BamBam	—N/a	—N/a	—N/a	—N/a	—N/a	—N/a	—N/a	—N/a	—N/a	—N/a	—N/a	✔	—N/a
Hong Kong	Jackson Wang	—N/a	—N/a	—N/a	—N/a	—N/a	—N/a	—N/a	—N/a	—N/a	—N/a	—N/a	✔	—N/a
Greece	Andreas Varsakopoulos	—N/a	—N/a	—N/a	—N/a	—N/a	—N/a	—N/a	—N/a	—N/a	—N/a	—N/a	✔	—N/a
Norway	Nikolai Johnsen	—N/a	—N/a	—N/a	—N/a	—N/a	—N/a	—N/a	—N/a	—N/a	—N/a	—N/a	—N/a	✔

=== Trip backgrounds and short episode summaries ===
==== 1st trip - China ====
The first country visited was China, the home of Zhang Yuan, a foreign representative on the Non-Summit show, including Zhang's home city of Anshan, and other tourist areas, for six days and five nights. Along for the trip were "Visitors", South Korean Non-Summit presenter Yoo Se-yoon, and Non-Summit foreign representatives Guillaume Patry from Canada, Alberto Mondi from Italy, Julian Quintart from Belgium and Tyler Rasch from the United States.

- Ep. 1 - February 7, 2015 - Trip plans in Seoul, and travel to China.
- Ep. 2 - February 14, 2015 - Settling in at Lijiang hotel, market visit.
- Ep. 3 - February 21, 2015 - Leaving Lijiang, touring lake region, arrival at Zhang's Anshan home.
- Ep. 4 - February 28, 2015 - Visiting with Zhang's family, dinner and karaoke; overnight stay.
- Ep. 5 - March 7, 2015 - Final visits with Zhang's mother and family, Zhang's matchmaking date.

==== 2nd trip - Belgium ====
The second trip was to Julian Quintart's home country of Belgium, with the same cast and an additional seventh member, They visited the city of Brussels and Quintart's home in Aywaille in Liège, and other tourist areas.

- Ep. 6 - March 14, 2015 - Make plans, travel to Brussels, tour Grand-Place, meet Quintart's sister.
- Ep. 7 - March 21, 2015 - Breakfast/farewell to sister; tour Baarle-Hertog, Bruges, Binche, Brussels.
- Ep. 8 - March 28, 2015 - Travel to Liège and Aywaille, visit Quintart's grandmother, arrive at parents' home.
- Ep. 9 - April 4, 2015 - Breakfast party, riding (horses, bicycles, motorcycle), visit teacher and friends.
- Ep. 10 - April 11, 2015 - Last night at home with Quintart family and friends, parting after breakfast.

==== 3rd trip - Nepal ====
The filming of the Nepal trip was done subsequent to the April 2015 Nepal earthquake, which occurred on April 25, the day of the second episode of the trip's airing, show Episode No. 12, (and the following May 2015 Nepal earthquake). The station and show's responses are noted in the episode summaries.

The travel agenda announced added a surprise cast to the third trip in April 2015, to Sujan Shakya's home country of Nepal, to visit the "mysterious ancient ruins" and Shakya's large extended family. The cast included Shakya as the country host, Yoo, Zhang and Mondi, as on the previous two trips, and added current Non-Summit cast member, Germany's Daniel Lindemann and the United States intern, Mark Tetto, who appeared on Episode 24 of Non-Summit. The surprise revealed was British mountain climber and adventurer, United Kingdom's James Hooper, who appeared on the original cast of Non-Summit, Episodes 1–4.

- Ep. 11 - April 18, 2015 - Seoul plans, travel to Kathmandu and Pokhara; Hooper flight problems.
- Ep. 12 - April 25, 2015 - **(Special show credits aired about April 2015 Nepal earthquake.) Overnight and tour Pokhara, Phewa Lake boat rides to Tal Barahi Temple.
- Ep. 13 - May 2, 2015 - Dhampus hiking, Sarangkot paragliding, Kathmandu arrive at Shakya's home.
- Ep. 14 - May 9, 2015 - Family dinner party; tour Thamel, Kathesimbhu Stupa, jog to Swayambhunath.
- Ep. 15 - May 16, 2015 - Tour Patan, Bhaktapur, meet Kumari Devi; Kathmandu markets, family time.
- Ep. 16 - May 23, 2015 - Kodari elementary school visit, bungee jumping; Prime College basketball match.
- Ep. 17 - May 30, 2015 - Farewell to family; Shakya and Tetto return to Kathmandu after earthquakes.

==== 4th trip - Italy ====
The fourth trip was to Alberto Mondi's home country of Italy, with the same cast that visited Nepal; Yoo, Zhang, Lindemann, Hooper and Tetto. Shakya was scheduled to take the trip, but due to the earthquake in Nepal and his concern for it, he was replaced by another of the younger representatives, France's Robin Deiana.

- Ep. 18 - June 6, 2015 - Seoul meeting with Mondi's wife's younger sister; travel to Italy's Tuscany, tour Pienza.
- Ep. 19 - June 13, 2015 - Swim at Saturnia, travel to and tour Venezia, enjoy Italian cuisine.
- Ep. 20 - June 20, 2015 - Finish Venezia tour, meet Mondi brothers, travel to Mondi home in Mirano.
- Ep. 21 - June 27, 2015 - Friends and Italians football match, meet grandparents, celebrate parent's anniversary.
- Ep. 22 - July 4, 2015 (first half of program) - Meet Mondi's friends, tour Bassano del Grappa with parents, farewells.

==== 5th trip - Canada ====
The fifth trip went to Guillaume Patry and Henry Lau's home in Quebec and Toronto(Ontario) with cast Yoo seyoon, Zhang Yuan, Sujan Shakya, and Patry's best friend John Riley. Riley is the Deputy Head of Mission of the New Zealand Embassy Seoul, first serving there in 2001. Riley speaks Korean, English, and Māori; his grandfather is Māori.

The trip included a visit to first time cast member Super Junior Henry's home in Toronto, to show the various cultures of the second largest country in the world.

- Ep. 22 - July 4, 2015 (last half of program) - Seoul planning meeting, visit with Canadian Ambassador to South Korea.
- Ep. 23 - July 11, 2015 - Travel to Niagara Falls (boat, helicopter tour) and Toronto (CN Tower tour).
- Ep. 24 - July 18, 2015 - Tour Toronto; visit Henry's family, overnight stay. Fly to Quebec, tour city.
- Ep. 25 - July 25, 2015 - StarCraft play-off; Charlesbourg with Patry's mother; birthday party, jogging, swimming.
- Ep. 26 - August 8, 2015 - Visit Quebec fire station, meet Patry's father and brother, tour Quebec. (August 1 broadcast preempted by airing of 2015 EAFF Women's East Asian Cup.)

==== 6th trip - South Korea (Buyeo County) ====
The show's producer Bang Hyun-young said in order to give the cast a summer break, they would film the 6th trip locally in South Korea, as there were many great places to visit domestically. Professor Yoo Hong-jun, of Myongji University and former head of the Cultural Heritage Administration of Korea was a guest on the show. The trip also included presenters Yoo Seyun and Jun Hyun-moo, his first time on show; representatives Guillaume Patry, Alberto Mondi, Zhang Yuan, Daniel Lindemann, Tyler Rasch and first time with friends, ex-Non-Summit representative Blair Williams.

- Ep. 27 - August 15, 2015 - Travel to South Chungcheong Province, tour Tomb of King Muryeong, Gongju National Museum, Jeongnimsa Temple pagoda; meet Professor Yoo's wife.
- Ep. 28 - August 22, 2015 - Visit with Professor Yoo's community; tour South Chungcheong Province's Jangha-ri 3-storey stone pagoda, Baekma River boat ride, Buseosanseong, Nakhwaam, Buyeo National Museum.

==== 7th trip - Australia ====
The seventh trip was to Australia, to visit the home of ex-Non-Summit member, Blair Williams, from the 2015 cast. Ex-Non-Summit member from the 2014 cast, Japan's Takuya Terada, traveled with him as the newest cast member. Recurring cast members Yoo, Mondi, Zhang, Lindemann and Hooper were also on the trip.

- Ep.29 - August 29, 2015 - Travel to Sydney, team split between Sydney and Wollongong.
- Ep.30 - September 5, 2015 - Rock climbing and tandem skydiving in Wollongong, meet Hooper's wife, camping and barbecue.
- Ep.31 - September 12, 2015 - Yoga, surfing in Wollongong, travel to Brisbane, meet Williams' family, dinner & breakfast, house tour.
- Ep.32 - September 19, 2015 - Visit to South Bank and University of Queensland, play bubble football, learn ballet from Williams younger sister, visit to Gold Coast.
- Ep.33 - September 26, 2015 - Ride Hot air balloon, go surfing at Surfers Paradise, play at Dreamworld and potluck party with Williams' family and friends.

==== 8th trip - France ====
The eighth trip was to France, to visit the home of ex-Non-Summit member, Robin Deiana. Recurring members Tetto, Patry, Mondi and Zhang were along, as well as new cast member and Ghana representative on Non-Summit, Sam Okyere. This marks the first trip Yoo was absent, due to scheduling conflicts.

- Ep.34 - October 3, 2015 - Deiana and Tetto visit to Paris, Giverny and Barbizon, meet other friends at Marseille and boat to Frioul archipelago.
- Ep.35 - October 10, 2015 - Frioul archipelago beach swim, snorkeling off yacht, tour Marseille, travel to Fontaine-de-Vaucluse.
- Ep.36 - October 17, 2015 - Tour Palais des Papes in Avignon, van Gogh tour and Arles Amphitheatre bullfights in Arles; meet Deiana family in Avallon.
- Ep.37 - October 28, 2015 - Winery visit in near Avallon, swim at local pool, dinner with Deiana family.
- Ep.38 - November 4, 2015 (first half of program) - Rafting at Morvan Regional Natural Park with Deiana's father, meet Deiana's b-boying friends in Avallon, surprise lunch with parents, farewells.

==== 9th trip - Germany ====
The show's ninth trip will visit Germany and Daniel Lindemann's home in Cologne. The friends who will be joining him on this trip are cast members Yoo, Mondi, Zhang, Okyere and Williams, with the addition of Bulgarian chef Mihal Ashminov from JTBC's Please Take Care of My Refrigerator.

- Ep.38 - November 4, 2015 (last half of program) - Friends' meeting in Seoul for planning.
- Ep.39 - November 11, 2015 - Flight to Frankfurt, dinner and hotel in Oberwesel, visit Schönburg Castle and Bundesliga match.
- Ep.40 - November 18, 2015 - Bundesliga match, visit to Heidelberg and Dachau concentration camp and meeting Koo Ja-cheol from FC Augsburg.
- Ep.41 - November 25, 2015 - Meeting Koo Ja-cheol, visit to Munich and celebrate Oktoberfest, and travelling to Cologne and touring Cologne Cathedral.
- Ep.42 - December 2, 2015 - Travel to Langenfeld, meet Lindemann's family, meet Lindemann's friend, Kart racing at the Michael Schumacher karting center and water skiing.
- Ep.43 - December 9, 2015 - Water skiing, travel to Leverkusen to meet Lindemann's friend, cooking and dinner with family at Lindemann's grandmother's house.
- Ep.44 - December 16, 2015 - travel to Berlin, visit Holocaust Memorial, Brandenburg Gate, Berlin Wall, Checkpoint Charlie, Berlin Cathedral, Fernsehturm Berlin, ride party bike and clubbing.

==== 10th trip - New Zealand ====
The tenth trip of the show will be to New Zealand, the home of John Riley from the Canada trip. Joining him are recurring members Patry, Zhang, Shakya, Terada, and first time member on the show, singer Lee Jung. Yoo was expected to join this trip, but will be absent due to his maternal grandmother's funeral.

- Ep.45 - December 23, 2015 - Seoul meeting, travel to Queenstown and bungee jumping, visit Lake Wakatipu, visit Auckland and experience at animal farm.
- Ep.46 - December 30, 2015 - Visit to Mount Cook and Tasman Glacier in Mount Cook National Park, reunite in Auckland with seafood dinner.
- Ep.47 - January 6, 2016 - Early morning exercise, rugby game and sailing in Auckland.
- Ep.48 - January 13, 2016 - Bungee jumping, meet Riley's mother and family friends and visit Tikitere or "Hell's Gate".
- Ep.49 - January 20, 2016 - Māori experience in Rotorua, morning exercise at Riley family home, singing session, farewell to Riley's mother and travel to Hobbiton and Taupō.
- Ep.50 - January 27, 2016 - Hobbiton, golf at Lake Taupō, Coromandel Peninsula and Hot Water Beach and farewell to family.

==== 11th trip - South Korea (Jeju Island) ====
Show producer Bang Hyun-young announced the eleventh trip will see the cast visiting Jeju Island for the winter break, the second domestic trip in the show. For this trip, recurring members Yoo, Patry, Zhang and Mondi will be joined with Ashminov (from the Germany trip), Riley (from the Canada and New Zealand trips) and Lee Jung, who was on the previous New Zealand trip. First time cast member comedian Jang Dong-min will join them, as per the cast's live fan meeting on South Korea's Naver V-app before the Jeju trip.

- Ep.51 - February 3, 2016 - meet at airport, travel to Jeju Island, walk along Jeju Olle Trail, visit church, Dae Jang Geum film setting, dinner at pension, breakfast at restaurant and visit beach.
- Ep.52 - February 10, 2016 - tangerine harvesting, scuba diving, ATV ride, and performance at Lee Jung's house.
- Ep.53 - February 21, 2016 - split into food tour and nature tour, restaurant, visit Saebyeol Oreum, Jeju Folk Museum, try out Jeju food and visit to green tea farm and maze.
- Ep.54 - February 28, 2016 - night at house, hail, fishing and visiting an elementary school.

==== 12th trip - Thailand ====
The twelfth trip of the show will be set in Thailand, the home of new cast member BamBam of pop idol group GOT7. Recurring members Yoo, Mondi and Ashminov will be making trip, who will be joined with new cast members Jackson Wang from Hong Kong, also from GOT7, and current Non-Summit cast member Andreas Varsakopoulos of Greece.

- Ep.55 - March 6, 2016 - Seoul meeting, travel to Bangkok and Chiang Rai, night market and dinner, travel to Thailand-Myanmar border.
- Ep.56 - March 13, 2016 - visit to village, taste local coffee, teach children, farming, market, dinner and performance.
- Ep.57 - March 20, 2016 - visit to elephant care center near Chiang Mai, travel to Bangkok and meet BamBam's family, dinner, breakfast and visit to Buddhist temple.
- Ep.58 - March 27, 2016 - Muay Thai activity, visit to Khaosan Road, travel to Krabi and go diving and rock climbing at Railay Beach.

==== 13th trip - United States ====
The show's thirteenth trip will be to the United States, the home of recurring member Tyler Rasch. Joining him will be recurring members Yoo and Patry, alongside new cast member and current Non-Summit cast member Nikolai Johnsen of Norway. The friends are set to visit Rasch's home state of Vermont for the trip.

- Ep.59 - April 8, 2016 - meet at Seoul airport, travel to New York City, visit Madison Square, Rockefeller Center and Top of the Rock, helicopter tour over Lower Manhattan and Liberty Island, dinner at steakhouse restaurant with Rasch's sister, brother in-law and nephew.
- Ep.60 - April 15, 2016 - travel to Somerset, Massachusetts, meet Rasch maternal family, golf lesson, visit to Rasch's high school The Putney School in Vermont and meet Rasch paternal family.
- Ep.61 - April 22, 2016 - visit Hollywood and Venice Beach, view Hollywood Walk of Fame, Dolby Theatre, TCL Chinese Theatre and Universal Studios Hollywood.
- Ep.62 - April 29, 2016 - skydiving experience at Universal Studios, visit to Death Valley, and final episode of Season 1.

== Soundtrack ==
Yoo wrote and produced a song, "At Your House", which was part of the show's original soundtrack (OST) on February 7, 2015. It features vocal group Urban Zakapa and cast members Patry, Mondi, Zhang, Quintart and Rasch, speaking in their native languages. Yoo said he was inspired to write the song after the filming of the friends' bicycle outing (Episode 3) in China.

Another OST, "What Brings You Here", by Yoo and Eastbeam, was released by Sony Music Entertainment on April 25, 2015.

== Ratings and scheduling changes ==
- Episode ratings (Note: Ratings for each episode can be viewed at individual episode summaries, List of Where Is My Friend's Home episodes, in upper right corner.)

Channel	Period	Airing time
JTBC	February 7, 2015 – May 23, 2015	Saturdays 8:30 p.m. - 9:40 p.m. (KST)
JTBC	May 30, 2015 – July 11, 2015	Saturdays 9:50 p.m. - 11:00 p.m.
JTBC	July 18, 2015 – September 19, 2015	Saturdays 9:45 p.m. - 11:00 p.m.
JTBC	September 26, 2015 – October 17, 2015	Saturdays 9:40 p.m. - 11:00 p.m.
JTBC	October 28, 2015 – February 10, 2016	Wednesdays 9:30 p.m. - 10:50 p.m.
JTBC	February 21, 2016 – March 27, 2016	Sundays 9:40 p.m. - 11:00 p.m.
JTBC	April 8, 2016 – April 29, 2016	Fridays 11:20 p.m. - 12:30 a.m.

The show started airing on Saturdays in the JTBC scheduling, in February 2015, with average top ratings in the 3% range. After scheduling changed the show to Wednesday nights in October 2015, ratings suffered, and a third scheduling change to Sundays in February 2016, furthered the ratings drop. The thirteenth trip to the U.S. on April 8, 2016, changed the airing day to Fridays.
