= List of Non-Summit episodes =

Non-Summit (Korean: 비정상회담) is a South Korean talk-variety show, part of JTBC's Monday night lineup. The show aired from July 7, 2014 to December 4, 2017.

== Series overview ==
Year	Episodes	Originally released	
Year	Episodes	First released	Last released
2014	26	July 7, 2014	December 29, 2014
2015	52	January 5, 2015	December 28, 2015
2016	52	January 4, 2016	December 26, 2016
2017	47	January 9, 2017	December 4, 2017

== Episodes ==
The show began with eleven foreign men cast as "Representatives" and three South Korean hosts. "Visiting interns" were incorporated into the cast, as regular members took vacations, and some left the show. The debate topics are presented by visiting South Korean guests.

=== 2014 ===
(episodes 1-26)

=== 2015 ===
(episodes 27-78)

=== 2016 ===
(episodes 79-130)

=== 2017 ===
(episodes 131-177)
