= Daniel Snoeks =

Australian-born South Korea-based model, television personality, and tattoo artist

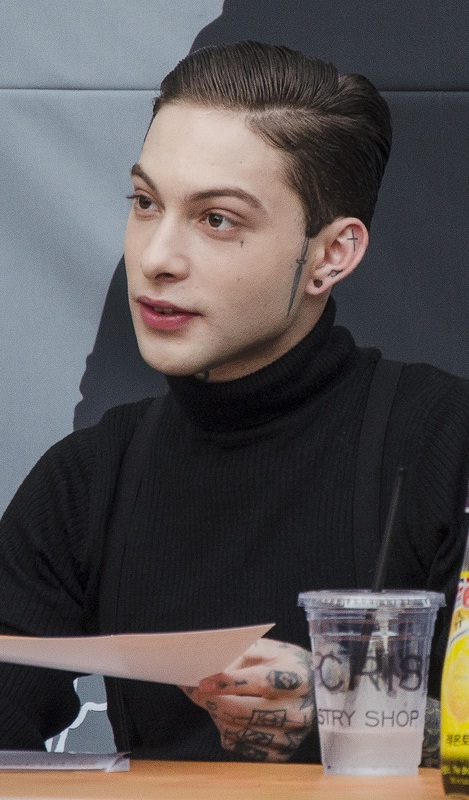
- Born: 12 July 1994 (age 30); Darwin, Australia
- Occupation(s): Model, television personality, tattooist
- Website: Daniel Snoeks on Instagram

Daniel Jacobus Snoeks (born 12 July 1994) is an Australian model, television personality and tattooist, who lives and performs in Vancouver, Canada. He was a cast member in the talk show Non-Summit. In October 2014, Snoeks hosted Saturday Night Live Korea.

Daniel founded Le Papillon Studios in 2020.

== Personal ==
Born to a Dutch father and a Papua New Guinean mother, Snoeks started Taekwondo when he was 4 years old.

== Filmography ==
=== Television series ===
| Year | Title | Role | Network | Notes |
|---|---|---|---|---|
| 2014 | Non-Summit | Himself | JTBC | cast member |
| 2014 | Saturday Night Live Korea | Himself | TVN | host |

=== Music video appearances ===
| Year | Song | Artist(s) |
|---|---|---|
| 2014 | Like a Cat | AOA |
| 2015 | Whoa Ha ! | Vasco |
| 2016 | anti | Vasco |
| 2016 | Sergio Leone | Used Cassettes |
