= Nikolai Johnsen =

Norwegian model in South Korea (born 1988)

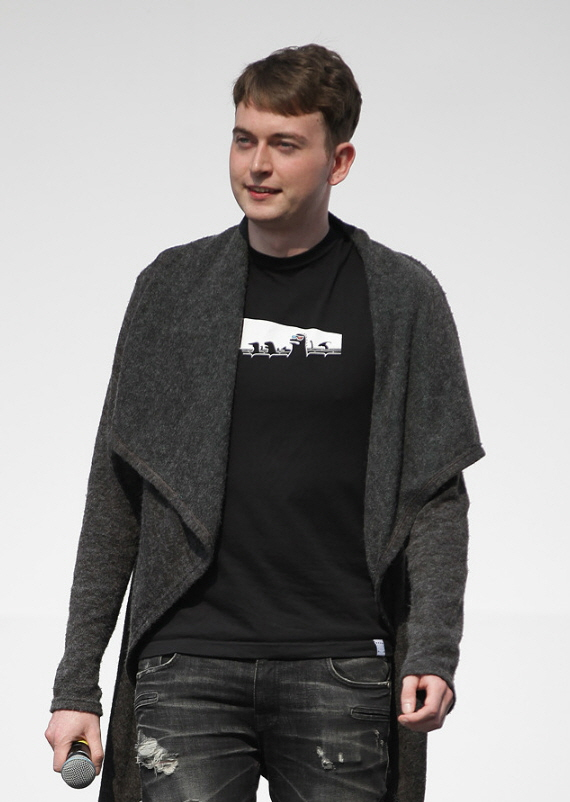
- Born: 24 August 1988 (age 37); Sandefjord
- Occupation: Television personality

Nikolai Johnsen (born 24 August 1988) is a Norwegian who lives and performs in South Korea as a television personality and graduate student in international studies at Korea University.

== Career ==
In the summer of 2015 he first appeared on the television program Non-Summit as the Norwegian representative. On October 7, 2015, Norwegian Seafood Council appointed him as an goodwill ambassador for Norwegian seafood. In 2016, he has served as honorary ambassador for film The Wave.

== Filmography ==
=== Television series ===
Year	Title	Role	Notes
2015–2016, 2017	Non-Summit	Himself	cast member
2016	Where Is My Friend's Home	Himself	cast member
2016	Cook Representative	Himself	
