= Zhang Yu'an =

Chinese television personality (born 1984)

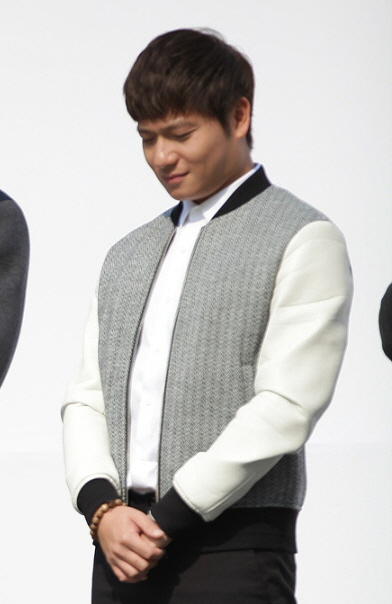
- Born: March 4, 1984 (age 41); Shenyang, Liaoning, China
- Occupation(s): Television personality, announcer, teacher
- Agent: SM C&C
- Website: Zhang Yu'an on Instagram

Zhang Yu'an (simplified Chinese: 张玉安; traditional Chinese: 張玉安; pinyin: Zhāng Yù'ān; born March 4, 1984) is a Chinese television personality and radio host, who is currently active in South Korea. He was a cast member in the talk show Non-Summit and its spin-off travel-reality show, Where Is My Friend's Home.

== Personal ==
Born in Shenyang and grew up in Anshan, China, he graduated from Jilin University.

== Career ==
He was an announcer for Beijing TV before moving to South Korea, and is currently a host on the radio show 首尔生活加油站. He is also a teacher at a Chinese language hagwon in Gangnam.

On July 7, 2014, he appeared as a cast member on Non-Summit, representing his home country of China. Popular with the South Korean visiting guests on the show, media wrote that he "captured the hearts of viewers with his endless charm and his innocence, as he strongly states his opinions".

In February, 2015, his home in China was the first one selected for a visit by the travel-reality show Where Is My Friend's Home where he played host to some of his fellow cast members from Non-Summit, for a six-day, five night visit to some popular tourist spots in China, and visits with his family in Anshan. He continued as cast on episodes for visits to the next countries, Belgium and Nepal.

After signing with entertainment agency SM C&C, he said he would continue activities in the Korean and Chinese markets.

In April 2015, he was the special MC for the 2015 The 3rd YinYueTai V-Chart Awards held in Beijing, China.

In January 2016, he became Hwang Chi Yeul's Mango TV manager for I Am a Singer Season 4.

== Filmography ==
=== Television series ===
Year	Title	Role	Notes
2017	Missing Nine		Supporting role

=== Variety shows ===
Year	Title	Role	Notes
2014	Non-Summit	Himself	cast member
2014	Talk Show taxi	Himself	1 episode
2014	Please Take Care of My Refrigerator	Himself	1 episode
2014	Super Junior M Guest House	Himself	1 episode
2015	Where Is My Friend's Home	Himself	cast member
2016	Happy Together	Himself	episode 386
2016	Sister's Slam Dunk	Himself	Guest, episode 24
2017	Hello Counselor	Himself	Episode 306
2017	King of Mask Singer	Contestant	Episode 107
2018	Super Junior's Super TV	Himself	Episode 3 & 4
