= Vingle (social network) =

South Korean social networking website

- Website type: Social networking service
- Founded: October 21, 2011 (14 years ago)
- Founder: Changseong Ho Jiwon Moon
- Key people: Jiwon Moon (CEO); Changseong Ho (President and COO); Mark Tetto (CFO); Hunter Moon (Marketing Manager)
- Industry: Internet
- Employees: 10+
- Website: www.vingle.net
- Registration: Required
- Current status: Operations Halted/Suspended

Vingle was a social networking website.

== Founding ==
The company was launched on October 21, 2011, by Changseong Ho and Jiwon Moon, creators of Viki, which they sold for $200 million. In 2012 Vingle received Series A funding from K Cube Ventures. The co-founders had also invested $1 million in the company, and in its first four months, Vingle had about 600,000 unique monthly visitors. On Viki users would translate and subtitle television shows or movies, so Ho and Moon started Vingle to grow the number of interest groups and crowdsourcing projects that users could pursue on the site.

== Overview ==
The social network was initially based on a South Korean website, but in 2014 moved to an iOS and Android app. That year the network had 2.3 million users and 100 million monthly page views across about three thousand interest focused communities. The app received 1.4 million downloads in its first year, and Vingle next began to expand into Japan and the United States. By late 2014, Vingle had four million monthly visitors from 105 countries, with content in twenty-six different languages. As of 2015, the company was valued at $1 billion.

== Use ==
Vingle required users to sign up to access its communities, either through a user account or via another social media account. Once on the site, users record their personal interests and begin to use the site's collection tool to follow other users interested in the same topics. Users can publish their own posts called "cards", which can contain video, images, and text.
