= Guillaume Patry =

Canadian professional StarCraft player (born 1982)

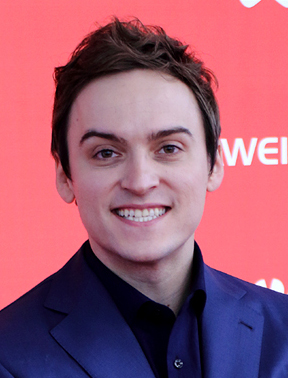

Personal information
- Name: Guillaume Patry
- Nationality: Canadian

Career information
- Game: StarCraft
- Playing career: Until 2004
- Role: Protoss

Guillaume Patry is a Canadian professional StarCraft player who plays under the alias Grrrr... He is from Quebec City, was a StarCraft world champion in 1999. He dominated the scene as a random player before he arrived in Korea, where he then focused on the Protoss race. While Garimto pioneered many "cheesy" strategies for Protoss, virtually every (then) standard build order was a direct result of Grrr's innovations. He won the Hanaro OSL- the first OSL in history- a king of king's tournament, and placed high in a variety of others in a long career. Eventually his interest and performance in Starcraft declined, resulting in his retirement in early 2004.

After he retired, he became a gambler with Bertrand Grospellier, former French professional StarCraft gamer, but quit again.

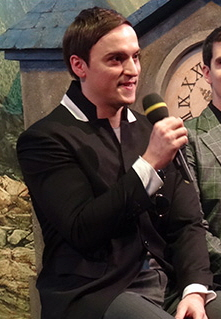
Patry in 2014

According to a report from FOMOS (online professional game media), he's living a life as an ordinary staff member of a company, but he said that he could return to the professional game field after the release of StarCraft II: Wings of Liberty.

He was a panelist on the talk show Non-Summit and a cast member of the variety-travel show that branched off it, Where Is My Friend's Home in South Korea. In May 2015 it was announced that Patry had signed the management contract with JTBC.

In 2023, he starred in Season 1 of the Netflix original series The Devil's Plan, directed by Jeong Jong-yeon. The premise of the Korean reality TV show is to survive problem-solving challenges and navigate social dynamics. He was the first contestant eliminated.

== Tournament results ==
- 1st — Hanaro OSL

== See also ==
- StarCraft in esports
