= Blair Williams =

Australian TV personality (born 1992)

Blair Richard Williams
- Born: 10 January 1992 (age 33); Brisbane, Queensland
- Education: Queensland University, BA in Korean Studies, and International Business
- Occupation(s): Television personality, digital marketer
- Website: Blair Williams on Twitter Blair Williams on Instagram

Blair Richard Williams (born 10 January 1992) is an Australian who lives and performs in South Korea as a television personality and digital marketer for Doosan Bears baseball team. He was a cast member in the television show Where Is My Friend's Home.

== Filmography ==
=== Television series ===
Year	Title	Network	Role	Notes
2014–2015	Non-Summit	JTBC	Himself	cast member
2015	Where Is My Friend's Home	JTBC	Himself	cast member
2019	I Hate Going To Work	KBS2	Himself	cast member
