= List of Non-Summit cast members =

The following is a list of Non-Summit cast members, past and present.

== Summit leaders ==
Country	Title	Name	Birthday
South Korea	Secretary General	Yoo Se-yoon	September 12, 1980 (age 46)
South Korea	Co-chairman	Jun Hyun-moo	November 7, 1977 (age 48)
South Korea	Co-chairman	Sung Si-kyung	April 17, 1979 (age 47)

== Current representatives ==
Country	Name	Korean Name	Birthday	Episodes
United States	Mark Tetto	마크 테토	March 1, 1980 (age 46)	24, 103 - present (Absent 141, 142)
France	Aurelien Loubert	오헬리엉 루베르	December 30, 1981 (age 44)	103 - present (Absent 138)
Canada	Guillaume Patry	기욤 패트리	June 19, 1982 (age 44)	1 - present (Absent 69, 111,131)
Italy	Alberto Mondi	알베르토 몬디	January 17, 1984 (age 42)	1 - present (Absent 12, 64, 65, 78)
Pakistan	Zahid Hussain	자히드 후세인	November 25, 1988 (age 37)	103 - present (Absent 111,126,131)
China	Wang Xinlin	왕심린	October 13, 1989 (age 37)	106, 111 - present
Switzerland	Alex Mazzucchelli	알렉스 맞추켈리	May 17, 1990 (age 36)	103 - present (Absent 111,120,131,141)
Japan	Ogi Hitoshi	오오기 히토시	April 6, 1992 (age 34)	105, 111 - present (Absent 146,147)
Germany	Niklas Klabunde	니클라스 클라분데	August 3, 1993 (age 33)	103 - present (Absent 131)
Mexico	Christian Burgos	크리스티안 부르고스	August 24, 1993 (age 33)	68, 105 - present (Absent 131)

== Former representatives ==
Country	Name	Korean Name	Birthday	Episodes
United Kingdom	James Hooper	제임스 후퍼	April 19, 1987 (age 39)	1 – 4, 12 (by video), 33, 100
Australia	Daniel Snoeks	다니엘 스눅스	July 12, 1994 (age 32)	1 – 17
Turkey	Enes Kaya	에네스 카야	August 22, 1984 (age 42)	1 – 24 (Absent 11, Edited out of 23 and 24)
Russia	Ilya Belyakov	일리야 벨랴코프	August 26, 1982 (age 44)	20, 28 – 52, 100
Belgium	Julian Quintart	줄리안 퀸타르트	August 24, 1987 (age 39)	1 – 52 (Absent 48), 100
Nepal	Sujan Shakya	수잔 샤키야	March 10, 1988 (age 38)	27 – 52 (Absent 49), 100
France	Robin Deiana	로빈 데이아나	July 18, 1990 (age 36)	1 – 52, 75, 100
Australia	Blair Williams	블레어 윌리엄스	January 10, 1992 (age 34)	22, 28 – 52 (Absent 41), 100
Japan	Takuya Terada	테라다 타쿠야	March 18, 1992 (age 34) (Note: A JTBC 2015 Non-Summit calendar sold online and at Kyobo bookstores incorrectly listed Takuya Terada's birthdate as March 19, when the correct date is March 18.)	1 – 52 (Absent 17, 22, 45), 100
Japan	Yuta Nakamoto	나카모토 유타	October 26, 1995 (age 31)	53 – 78, 100 (by video)
China	Zhang Yuan	장위안	March 4, 1984 (age 42)	1 – 102
Poland	Przemysław Krompiec	프셰므스와브 크롬피에츠	March 3, 1985 (age 41)	53 – 102
Germany	Daniel Lindemann	다니엘 린데만	October 16, 1985 (age 41)	5 – 102 (Absent 95)
Brazil	Carlos Gorito	카를로스 고리토	May 17, 1986 (age 40)	53 – 102 (Absent first half 101, video 102)
United States	Tyler Rasch	타일러 라쉬	May 6, 1988 (age 38)	1 – 102 (Absent 13, 56, 65, 83)
Norway	Nikolai Johnsen	니콜라이 욘센	August 24, 1988 (age 38)	53 – 102, 131
Egypt	Samy Rashad (El-Baz) (Note: On Episode 11, the Egyptian intern introduced himself as (Samy Jung or 정새미), a name he chose for himself in Korean, and gave his full name, "Sami Mohamed Rashad Mahmoud Ahmed Kandil El-Baz"; media have written his name as "Sami El-Baz", "Samy Jung 정새미", and "Samy Rashad 새미 라샤드." After he became a representative on July 6, 2015, the show's credits listed his name in English as "Samy Rashad". For purposes for this article, he will be called "Samy Rashad El-Baz".)	새미 라샤드	April 25, 1990 (age 36)	11, 53 – 102
Greece	Andreas Varsakopoulos	안드레아스 바르사코풀로스	August 14, 1990 (age 36)	53 – 102
Ghana	Sam Okyere	샘 오취리	April 21, 1991 (age 35)	1 – 102 (Absent 91), 149
China	Mao Yifeng	모일봉	September 9, 1987 (age 39)	103 – 104
India	Lucky (Abhishek Gupta)	럭키 (아비쉐크 굽타)	June 16, 1978 (age 48)	103 – 144

== Visiting intern representatives ==
=== Season 1 ===
Country	Name	Korean Name	Episode	Replaced
Egypt	Samy Rashad (El-Baz)	새미 라샤드	11	Enes Kaya
Italy	Alberto Lussana	알베르토 루사나	12	Alberto Mondi
United States	Danny Arens	대니 애런즈	13	Tyler Rasch
Japan	Hiromitsu Takeda	다케다 히로미츠	17	Takuya Terada
Lebanon	Samer Samhoun	사메르 샘훈	18	Intern chair (Note: A permanent intern chair was made with Daniel Snoeks old chair, starting with Ep. 18.)
Peru	Sam Lévano	샘 레바노	19	Intern chair
Russia	Ilya Belyakov	일리야 벨랴코프	20	Intern chair
Colombia	Álvaro Sánchez	알바로 산체스	21	Intern chair
Australia	Blair Williams	블레어 윌리엄스	22	Intern chair
United States	Mark Tetto	마크 테토	24	Intern chair
Nepal	Sujan Shakya	수잔 샤키야	27	Intern chair
Thailand	Tatchara Longprasert	타차라 롱프라서드	66	Intern chair
United Kingdom	Mark Ancliff	마크 앤클리프	67	Intern chair
Mexico	Christian Burgos	크리스티안 부르고스	68	Intern chair
Spain	Gabriel Ruíz	가브리엘 루이스	69	Intern chair
Saudi Arabia	Yasser Khalifa	야세르 칼리파	70	Yasser Califa
India	Bhushan Kumar	부션 쿠마르	71	Intern chair
Netherlands	Sander Roomer	샌더 룸머	72	Intern chair
Venezuela	Antonio Bompart	안토니오 봄파르트	73, 165	Intern chair
Cambodia	Bot Wisalbot	복 위살봇	74, 109	Intern chair
Austria	Matthias Grabner	마티아스 그라브너	75	Intern chair
South Africa	Akeem Pedro	아킴 페드로	76	Intern chair
Bulgaria	Mihal Ashminov	미카엘 아쉬미노프	77	Intern chair
Bolivia	Mauricio Loayza	마우리시오 로아이자	78	Intern chair
North Korea (North Korean defectors)	Kang Chun-hyeok	강춘혁	79	Intern chair
Indonesia	Kiki Karnadi	키키 카르나디	80	Intern chair
Chile	Rodrigo Diaz	로드리고 디아즈	81	Intern chair
Ukraine	Andri Kurtov	안드리 쿠르토프	82	Intern chair
Vietnam	Đỗ An Ninh	도안닝	83	Intern chair
Ireland	Cillian Byrne	킬리안 번	84	Intern chair
Finland	Leo Ranta	레오 란타	85	Intern chair
Mongolia	Jargalmaa Suldbold	자갈마 술드볼드	86	Intern chair
Argentina	Gabriel Schvetz	가브리엘 슈베츠	87	Intern chair
New Zealand	Jack Stenhouse	잭 스텐하우스	88	Intern chair
Sweden	Ola Håkansson	올라 하칸슨	89	Intern chair
Bhutan	Rinchen Dawa	린첸 다와	90	Intern chair
China	Zhao Lijing	조이경	91	Intern chair
China	Ma Guojin	마국진	91	Intern chair
China	Zhang Wenjun	장문균	91	Intern chair
Belarus	Yuri Kim	유리 김	92	Intern chair
Hungary	Szabolcs Sárközi	샤르코지 소비	93	Intern chair
Azerbaijan	Nihat Khalilzade	니하트 할릴자데	94	Intern chair
Malaysia	Muhamad Khalid (Ismail)	무하마드 칼리드	95	Intern chair
Iran	Mohsen Shafiee	모센 샤피이	96, 136	Intern chair
United States	Guy Citron	가이 씨트론	97	Intern chair
United States	Jonathan Johnson	조나단 존슨	97	Intern chair
United States	Michael Lammbrau	마이클 람브라우	97	Intern chair
United States	Gabe Dye	개이브 다이	97	Intern chair
Pakistan	Sundubu Ali	선두부 알리	98	Intern chair
Kenya	Francis (Odongo) Ngome Okello	프란시스 응곰메 오켈로	99	Intern chair
Morocco	Amine Ammor	아민 아모르	101	Intern chair
Singapore	Reuben Ho	루벤호	102	Intern chair
United Kingdom	Emil Price	에밀 프라이스	104	
Mexico	Christian Burgos	크리스티안 부르고스	68, 105	
China	Wang Yu	왕유	105	
Japan	Ogi Hitoshi	오오기 히토시	105, 111	
South Africa	Akeem Pedro	아킴 페드로	76, 106	
China	Wang Xinlin	왕심린	106, 111	
Poland	Adela Borowiak	아델라 보로위아크	107	
Iran	Najafizadeh Sudeh	나자피자데 수데	107	
China	Shen Jing	심정	108	
United States	Robert Hamilton	로버트 해밀튼	109	
United Kingdom	Nathan Jackson	네이슨 잭슨	111	
Guinea	Gassim Fofana	가심 포파나	111	
Libya	Amira	아미라	111, 115	
United Kingdom	Simon Pegg	사이먼 페그	112	
Netherlands	Nadia Crystal Carli	나디아 크리스탈 카를리	113	
Philippines	Rigoberto Banta Jr.	리고베르토 반타	116	
Philippines	Celeste David	셀레스테 다비드	120	
United Kingdom	Andrew S. Millard	앤드류 밀라드	124	
Turkey	Sinasi Alpago	시나씨 알파고	126	
Turkey	Sinasi Alpago	시나씨 알파고	130	
United Kingdom	Tristan	트리스탄	131	
Norway	Nikolai Johnsen	니콜라이 욘센	131	
Ghana	Anita Hato	아니타 하토	131	
Russia	Olga	올가	131	
Turkey	Ceren	제렌	131	
Malaysia	Muhamad Khalid	무하마드 칼리드	95,131	
Mongolia	Surmen Sangsuuren	쉬르멘 산그수렌	132	
Iran	Mohsen Shafiee	모센 샤피이	96, 136	
Malaysia	Thamil Selvan	타밀 셀반	138	
United States	Chris Johnson	크리스 존슨	141	
Spain	Alejandro Sanabria	알레한드로 사나브리아	141	
United States	Joseph Nemelka	조셉 네멜카	142	
Russia	Eva	에바	146	
Japan	Takemura Natsumi	다케무라 나쯔미	146	
France	Olivia	올리비아	146	
Sweden	Ida	이다	146,147	
Japan	Hasegawa Natsuko	하세가와 나츠코	147	
Ghana	Sam Okyere	샘 오취리	149	
Kenya	John Ndiangui	존 운디앙구	150	
Brazil	Carlos Gorito	카를로스 고리토	151	
Russia	Dmitry	드미트리	151	
Russia	Yujina Svetlana	유지나 스웨틀라나	152	
Austria	Manu	마누	153	
Finland	Petri Kalliola	페트리 칼리올라	153, 166	
United Arab Emirates	샴사 알 다히리 شمسة الظاهري	154회		
United States	Steven Yeun	스티브 연	155	
China	강리즈 姜丽子		155	
Morocco	우메이마 파티흐 أوميما بارتيه		155	
France	마린; Marine		155	
Yemen	수헬라 سو هيرا	158회		
Kenya	필리스 운디앙구; Phyllis Ndiangui	158회		
United Kingdom	Aancod Jakareli	안코드 자카렐리	159회	
Italy	스테파니아; Stephanie		159회	
Russia	이나; Ида	160회		
India	럭키 लकी	161회		
United Kingdom	James	제임스	163	
Sweden	Oscar	오스카	163	
United Kingdom	Hamed Arif	하메드 아리프	165	
Russia	Zegna Smagin	제냐 스마긴	168	
Russia	Oleg Smagin	올렉 스마긴	168	
Russia	알료나; Аль Ринья	169회		
Indonesia	헨리 파할라 피닐리; Henry Pahala Pinilih	169회		
United States	Joel Roberts	조엘 로버츠	170	
Iran	Aydin Deray	에이딘 드레이	170	
Portugal	누리아; Nuria		170	
Vietnam	탄하; Tânhà	171회		
Nepal	수잔 샤키야 सुजन शाक्य	171회		
Myanmar	Than Kyaw Tun	딴쩌툰	172	
South Africa	Zino Slamet	지노 슬라멧	172	
Poland	Matthew Norwich	매튜 노윅스	172	
Spain	알마; Alma	173회		
Germany	필립; Philip	173회		
Russia	샤샤; Sascha	174회		
India	나디 नाडी	174회		
Russia	올가; Ольга	176회		
Indonesia	캐빈; Kevin	177회		
Colombia	호르헤; Jorge	177회		
