= Welcome, First Time in Korea? =

2017 South Korean television series

- Promotional poster
- Genre: Travel, Reality
- Country of origin: South Korea
- Original language: Korean
- No. of seasons: 2
- No. of episodes: Season 1: 33; Season 2: 386; Season 3: ongoing

Production
- Production location: South Korea
- Camera setup: Multi-camera

Original release
- Network: MBC every1
- Release: June 1, 2017 – present

Welcome, First Time in Korea? (Korean: 어서와~ 한국은 처음이지?) is a South Korean television show that airs on MBC every1. The show is in a reality television-travel show format and first aired on June 1, 2017. Each trip features a foreigner living in South Korea who invites three friends from their home country to travel to South Korea for the first time. The trips typically follow the format of the three friends traveling on their own for the first two days, followed by a two-day special tour organized by the hosting foreigner. Episodes also include concurrent commentary from a panel of hosts, together with the guest whose friends are featured.

In April 2020, the show changed to a "Living in Korea" special format due to travel restrictions resulting from the COVID-19 pandemic. However, they promised to return to the original concept once the world is able to comfortably travel abroad again. The revised format is similar to I Live Alone and My Neighbour, Charles, introducing the daily life and experiences of foreigners residing in Korea.

In July 2022, the show was rebooted to its original format as travel restrictions eased, allowing foreigners to easily visit South Korea again.

== Hosts ==
Main Hosts (Season 2 - Reboot)
Kim Jun-hyun	June 1, 2017 – July 1, 2021; July 7, 2022 – October 9, 2025
Lee Hyun-yi	July 7, 2022 – October 9, 2025
Alberto Mondi	June 1, 2017 – October 9, 2025

Former Hosts
Shin A-young	June 1, 2017 – October 22, 2020
DinDin	June 1, 2017 – July 1, 2021
Park Ji-min	October 29, 2020 – July 1, 2021
Do Kyung-wan	July 8, 2021 – June 30, 2022
Jang Do-yeon	September 2, 2021 – June 30, 2022

=== Special hosts ===
- Mina Fujii (September 28 – October 12, 2017)
- Christian Burgos (July 5–26, 2018 / April 13–20, 2023)
- Jo Seung-yeon (September 27 – October 18, 2018)
- Byul (April 11 – May 2, 2019)
- Sujan Shakya (September 5–26, 2019)
- Daniel Lindemann (July 7 – August 4, 2022 / March 2–23, 2023)
- Sam Hammington (August 24 – September 7, 2023)
- "Lucky" Abhishek Gupta (August 22–29, 2024)
- Dustin Nippert (July 24 - August 14, 2025)

"Vilppu's Diner" Special

- Kim Min-kyung (July 8 – August 26, 2021)
- Hong Ji-yoon (July 8 – August 26, 2021)
- Leo Ranta (August 5–19, 2021)

"Talking Show" Special

- Joy Albright (September 19, 2024)

== List of episodes ==
=== Pilot (June 1–15, 2017) ===
Episode	Broadcast date	Guest	Friends	Guest and friends' nationality
1	June 1, 2017	Alberto Mondi	Luca Bertho, Federico Minto, Francesco Pietro Bonn	Italy
2	June 8, 2017	Alberto Mondi	Luca Bertho, Federico Minto, Francesco Pietro Bonn	Italy
3	June 15, 2017	Alberto Mondi	Luca Bertho, Federico Minto, Francesco Pietro Bonn	Italy

=== Season 1 (July 27, 2017 – March 8, 2018) ===
Episode	Broadcast date	Guest	Friends	Guest and friends' nationality
1	July 27, 2017	Christian Burgos	Andrei Felice Salvador Salguelo, Christopher Gonzalez, Pablo Ivana Castillo Soto	Mexico
2	August 3, 2017	Christian Burgos	Andrei Felice Salvador Salguelo, Christopher Gonzalez, Pablo Ivana Castillo Soto	Mexico
3	August 10, 2017	Christian Burgos	Andrei Felice Salvador Salguelo, Christopher Gonzalez, Pablo Ivana Castillo Soto	Mexico
4	August 17, 2017	Christian Burgos	Andrei Felice Salvador Salguelo, Christopher Gonzalez, Pablo Ivana Castillo Soto	Mexico
5	August 24, 2017	Daniel Lindemann	Daniel Heidelberg, Mario Basur Poor, Peter Persich	Germany
6	August 31, 2017	Daniel Lindemann	Daniel Heidelberg, Mario Basur Poor, Peter Persich	Germany
7	September 7, 2017	Daniel Lindemann	Daniel Heidelberg, Mario Basur Poor, Peter Persich	Germany
8	September 14, 2017	Daniel Lindemann	Daniel Heidelberg, Mario Basur Poor, Peter Persich	Germany
9	September 21, 2017	Daniel Lindemann	Daniel Heidelberg, Mario Basur Poor, Peter Persich	Germany
10	September 28, 2017	Yudina Svetlana	Regina, Anastasia, Elena	Russia
11	October 5, 2017	Yudina Svetlana	Regina, Anastasia, Elena	Russia
12	October 12, 2017	Yudina Svetlana	Regina, Anastasia, Elena	Russia
13	October 19, 2017	"Lucky" Abhishek Gupta	Bikram, Shashank, Kashif	India
14	October 26, 2017	"Lucky" Abhishek Gupta	Bikram, Shashank, Kashif	India
15	November 2, 2017	"Lucky" Abhishek Gupta	Bikram, Shashank, Kashif	India
16	November 9, 2017	"Lucky" Abhishek Gupta	Bikram, Shashank, Kashif	India
17	November 16, 2017	Petri Kalliola	Ville, Vilppu, Sami	Finland
18	November 23, 2017	Petri Kalliola	Ville, Vilppu, Sami	Finland
19	November 30, 2017	Petri Kalliola	Ville, Vilppu, Sami	Finland
20	December 7, 2017	Petri Kalliola	Ville, Vilppu, Sami	Finland
21	December 14, 2017	Robin Deiana	Viktor, Marvin, Martin	France
22	December 21, 2017	Robin Deiana	Viktor, Marvin, Martin	France
23	December 28, 2017	Robin Deiana	Viktor, Marvin, Martin	France
24	January 4, 2018	Robin Deiana	Viktor, Marvin, Martin	France
25	January 11, 2018	James Hooper	David, Simon, Andrew	United Kingdom
26	January 18, 2018	James Hooper	David, Simon, Andrew	United Kingdom
27	January 25, 2018	James Hooper	David, Simon, Andrew	United Kingdom
28	February 1, 2018	James Hooper	David, Simon, Andrew	United Kingdom
29	February 8, 2018	Alberto Mondi Christian Burgos Daniel Lindemann "Lucky" Abhishek Gupta	"Welcome, Second Time in Korea?" – Jeju Island Special Luca Bertho, Federico Minto, Francesco Pietro Bonn Andrei Felice Salvador Salguelo, Christopher Gonzalez, Pablo Ivana Castillo Soto Daniel Heidelberg, Peter Persich Bikram, Shashank, Kashif	Italy; Mexico; Germany; India
30	February 15, 2018	Alberto Mondi Christian Burgos Daniel Lindemann "Lucky" Abhishek Gupta	"Welcome, Second Time in Korea?" – Jeju Island Special Luca Bertho, Federico Minto, Francesco Pietro Bonn Andrei Felice Salvador Salguelo, Christopher Gonzalez, Pablo Ivana Castillo Soto Daniel Heidelberg, Peter Persich Bikram, Shashank, Kashif	Italy; Mexico; Germany; India
31	February 22, 2018	Alberto Mondi Christian Burgos Daniel Lindemann "Lucky" Abhishek Gupta	"Welcome, Second Time in Korea?" – Jeju Island Special Luca Bertho, Federico Minto, Francesco Pietro Bonn Andrei Felice Salvador Salguelo, Christopher Gonzalez, Pablo Ivana Castillo Soto Daniel Heidelberg, Peter Persich Bikram, Shashank, Kashif	Italy; Mexico; Germany; India
32	March 1, 2018	Alberto Mondi Christian Burgos Daniel Lindemann "Lucky" Abhishek Gupta	"Welcome, Second Time in Korea?" – Jeju Island Special Luca Bertho, Federico Minto, Francesco Pietro Bonn Andrei Felice Salvador Salguelo, Christopher Gonzalez, Pablo Ivana Castillo Soto Daniel Heidelberg, Peter Persich Bikram, Shashank, Kashif	Italy; Mexico; Germany; India
33	March 8, 2018	Alberto Mondi Christian Burgos Daniel Lindemann "Lucky" Abhishek Gupta	"Welcome, Second Time in Korea?" – Jeju Island Special Luca Bertho, Federico Minto, Francesco Pietro Bonn Andrei Felice Salvador Salguelo, Christopher Gonzalez, Pablo Ivana Castillo Soto Daniel Heidelberg, Peter Persich Bikram, Shashank, Kashif	Italy; Mexico; Germany; India

=== Season 2 (May 10, 2018 – October 9, 2025) ===
Episode	Broadcast date	Guest	Friends	Guest and friends' nationality
1	May 10, 2018	Jang Min	Asael, Antonio, Neftali	Spain
2	May 17, 2018	Jang Min	Asael, Antonio, Neftali	Spain
3	May 24, 2018	Jang Min	Asael, Antonio, Neftali	Spain
4	May 31, 2018	Jang Min	Asael, Antonio, Neftali	Spain
5	June 7, 2018	Alex Mazzucchelli	Alessandro, Samuel, Anthony	Switzerland
6	June 14, 2018	Alex Mazzucchelli	Alessandro, Samuel, Anthony	Switzerland
7	June 21, 2018	Alex Mazzucchelli	Alessandro, Samuel, Anthony	Switzerland
8	June 28, 2018	Alex Mazzucchelli	Alessandro, Samuel, Anthony	Switzerland
9	July 5, 2018	Abigail Alderete	Veronica, Diana, Sylvia	Paraguay
10	July 12, 2018	Abigail Alderete	Veronica, Diana, Sylvia	Paraguay
11	July 19, 2018	Abigail Alderete	Veronica, Diana, Sylvia	Paraguay
12	July 26, 2018	Abigail Alderete	Veronica, Diana, Sylvia	Paraguay
13	August 2, 2018	Sujan Shakya	Anoj, Rina, Eliza, Shyam	Nepal
14	August 9, 2018	Sujan Shakya	Anoj, Rina, Eliza, Shyam	Nepal
15	August 16, 2018	Sujan Shakya	Anoj, Rina, Eliza, Shyam	Nepal
16 (Note: This episode was broadcast without the usual studio commentary, which was not filmed due to the passing of host Sujan Shakya's father.)	August 23, 2018	Sujan Shakya	Anoj, Rina, Eliza, Shyam	Nepal
17	August 30, 2018	Lee Dong Jun	William Reese, Brian Mills, Robert Wood	United States
18	September 6, 2018	Lee Dong Jun	William Reese, Brian Mills, Robert Wood	United States
19	September 13, 2018	Lee Dong Jun	William Reese, Brian Mills, Robert Wood	United States
20	September 20, 2018	Lee Dong Jun	William Reese, Brian Mills, Robert Wood	United States
21	September 27, 2018	Sinasi Alpago	Mikail, Mert, Jihat	Turkey
22	October 4, 2018	Sinasi Alpago	Mikail, Mert, Jihat	Turkey
23	October 11, 2018	Sinasi Alpago	Mikail, Mert, Jihat	Turkey
24	October 18, 2018	Sinasi Alpago	Mikail, Mert, Jihat	Turkey
25	October 25, 2018	Blair Williams	Mark, Meg, Kaitlin	Australia
26	November 1, 2018	Blair Williams	Mark, Meg, Kaitlin	Australia
27	November 8, 2018	Blair Williams	Mark, Meg, Kaitlin	Australia
28	November 15, 2018	Blair Williams	Mark, Meg, Kaitlin	Australia
29	November 22, 2018	Oumeima Fatih	Btissam Fatih, Maroua Brahimi, Asma Benbouzid	Morocco
30	November 29, 2018	Oumeima Fatih	Btissam Fatih, Maroua Brahimi, Asma Benbouzid	Morocco
31	December 6, 2018	Oumeima Fatih	Btissam Fatih, Maroua Brahimi, Asma Benbouzid	Morocco
32	December 13, 2018	Oumeima Fatih	Btissam Fatih, Maroua Brahimi, Asma Benbouzid	Morocco
33	December 20, 2018	Jakob Minell	Jakob, Viktor, Patrick	Sweden
34	December 27, 2018	Jakob Minell	Jakob, Viktor, Patrick	Sweden
35	January 3, 2019	Jakob Minell	Jakob, Viktor, Patrick	Sweden
36	January 10, 2019	Jakob Minell	Jakob, Viktor, Patrick	Sweden
37	January 17, 2019	Petri Kalliola	"Welcome, Second Time in Korea?" – Viewers' Tour Special Ville, Vilppu, Sami	Finland
38	January 24, 2019	Petri Kalliola	"Welcome, Second Time in Korea?" – Viewers' Tour Special Ville, Vilppu, Sami	Finland
39	January 31, 2019	Petri Kalliola	"Welcome, Second Time in Korea?" – Viewers' Tour Special Ville, Vilppu, Sami	Finland
40	February 7, 2019	Petri Kalliola	"Welcome, Second Time in Korea?" – Viewers' Tour Special Ville, Vilppu, Sami	Finland
41	February 14, 2019	Przemysław Kazimierz Krompiec	Ireneusz, Roberto, Karolina	Poland
42	February 21, 2019	Przemysław Kazimierz Krompiec	Ireneusz, Roberto, Karolina	Poland
43	February 28, 2019	Przemysław Kazimierz Krompiec	Ireneusz, Roberto, Karolina	Poland
44	March 7, 2019	Przemysław Kazimierz Krompiec	Ireneusz, Roberto, Karolina	Poland
45	March 14, 2019	Tatchara Longprasert	Ton, Green, Naveen	Thailand
46	March 21, 2019	Tatchara Longprasert	Ton, Green, Naveen	Thailand
47	March 28, 2019	Tatchara Longprasert	Ton, Green, Naveen	Thailand
48	April 4, 2019	Tatchara Longprasert	Ton, Green, Naveen	Thailand
49	April 11, 2019	Gerson Alejandro Castillo Rivas	Marjory, Soyeong, Jeongmi, Haram	Chile
50	April 18, 2019	Gerson Alejandro Castillo Rivas	Marjory, Soyeong, Jeongmi, Haram	Chile
51	April 25, 2019	Gerson Alejandro Castillo Rivas	Marjory, Soyeong, Jeongmi, Haram	Chile
52	May 2, 2019	Gerson Alejandro Castillo Rivas	Marjory, Soyeong, Jeongmi, Haram	Chile
53	May 9, 2019	Justin Harvey	Shaun, Char, Phumlani	South Africa
54	May 16, 2019	Justin Harvey	Shaun, Char, Phumlani	South Africa
55	May 23, 2019	Justin Harvey	Shaun, Char, Phumlani	South Africa
56	May 30, 2019	Justin Harvey	Shaun, Char, Phumlani	South Africa
57	June 6, 2019	Yanick	Jasper, Rene, Michiel	Netherlands
58	June 13, 2019	Yanick	Jasper, Rene, Michiel	Netherlands
59	June 20, 2019	Yanick	Jasper, Rene, Michiel	Netherlands
60	June 27, 2019	Yanick	Jasper, Rene, Michiel	Netherlands
61	July 4, 2019	David Woodworth	Darrin, Sam, Danny, Kyle	Canada
62	July 11, 2019	David Woodworth	Darrin, Sam, Danny, Kyle	Canada
63	July 18, 2019	David Woodworth	Darrin, Sam, Danny, Kyle	Canada
64	July 25, 2019	David Woodworth	Darrin, Sam, Danny, Kyle	Canada
65	August 1, 2019	Blair Williams	"Couple Special" Meg, Kait, John, Matt	Australia
66	August 8, 2019	Blair Williams	"Couple Special" Meg, Kait, John, Matt	Australia
67	August 15, 2019	Blair Williams	"Couple Special" Meg, Kait, John, Matt	Australia
68	August 22, 2019	Blair Williams	"Couple Special" Meg, Kait, John, Matt	Australia
69	August 29, 2019	5 Seconds of Summer	"5SOS Special" Luke, Calum, Ashton, Michael	Australia
70	September 5, 2019	John & Mac (United States)	"Yo! Welcome To Korea, Kids~" Ben, Harry, Jack, Georgina (Mom)	United Kingdom (Wales)
71	September 12, 2019	John & Mac (United States)	"Yo! Welcome To Korea, Kids~" Ben, Harry, Jack, Georgina (Mom)	United Kingdom (Wales)
72	September 19, 2019	John & Mac (United States)	"Yo! Welcome To Korea, Kids~" Ben, Harry, Jack, Georgina (Mom)	United Kingdom (Wales)
73	September 26, 2019	John & Mac (United States)	"Yo! Welcome To Korea, Kids~" Ben, Harry, Jack, Georgina (Mom)	United Kingdom (Wales)
74	October 3, 2019	Haakon	Eirik, Bode, Pablo	Norway
75	October 10, 2019	Haakon	Eirik, Bode, Pablo	Norway
76	October 17, 2019	Haakon	Eirik, Bode, Pablo	Norway
77	October 24, 2019	Haakon	Eirik, Bode, Pablo	Norway
78	October 31, 2019	Neil Smith	Daniel, Dara, Barry	Ireland
79	November 7, 2019	Neil Smith	Daniel, Dara, Barry	Ireland
80	November 14, 2019	Neil Smith	Daniel, Dara, Barry	Ireland
81	November 21, 2019	Neil Smith	Daniel, Dara, Barry	Ireland
82	November 28, 2019	Grace	Maribel, Aleida, Jose	Dominican Republic
83	December 5, 2019	Grace	Maribel, Aleida, Jose	Dominican Republic
84	December 12, 2019	Grace	Maribel, Aleida, Jose	Dominican Republic
85	December 19, 2019	Grace	Maribel, Aleida, Jose	Dominican Republic
86	December 26, 2019	Alaverdi	Emin, Murad, Ruslan	Azerbaijan
87	January 2, 2020	Alaverdi	Emin, Murad, Ruslan	Azerbaijan
88	January 9, 2020	Alaverdi	Emin, Murad, Ruslan	Azerbaijan
89	January 16, 2020	Alaverdi	Emin, Murad, Ruslan	Azerbaijan
90	January 23, 2020	Christian	Bjorn, Anton, Asger	Denmark
91	January 30, 2020	Christian	Bjorn, Anton, Asger	Denmark
92	February 6, 2020	Christian	Bjorn, Anton, Asger	Denmark
93	February 13, 2020	Christian	Bjorn, Anton, Asger	Denmark
94	February 21, 2020	Moses	Elbe, Breze, Fabrice	Rwanda
95	February 28, 2020	Moses	Elbe, Breze, Fabrice	Rwanda
96	March 3, 2020	Moses	Elbe, Breze, Fabrice	Rwanda
97	March 12, 2020	Moses	Elbe, Breze, Fabrice	Rwanda
98	March 20, 2020	Julian Quintart	Olivier Conrardy, Ulysse, Jon Jon, Olivier Jourdain	Belgium
99	March 26, 2020	Julian Quintart	Olivier Conrardy, Ulysse, Jon Jon, Olivier Jourdain	Belgium
100	April 2, 2020	Julian Quintart	Olivier Conrardy, Ulysse, Jon Jon, Olivier Jourdain	Belgium
101	April 9, 2020	Julian Quintart	Olivier Conrardy, Ulysse, Jon Jon, Olivier Jourdain	Belgium

==== "Living in Korea" Special (2020 ~ 2022) ====
The show's format changed due to the COVID-19 pandemic. Instead of having foreigners travel to Korea, the guests are foreigners already living in the country who show aspects of their daily life and experiences in Korea.

Episode	Broadcast date	Segment guests	Theme / Notes
102	April 16, 2020	Sissel (Denmark), Christian Burgos (Mexico), Chris Johnson (U.S.)	
103	April 23, 2020	Greg (U.S.), Karl Wayne (U.S.), Chris Johnson (U.S.)	
104	April 30, 2020	Philip Hellquist (Sweden) & Armin Mujakic (Austria) (of Chungnam Asan FC), Andreas (Greece)	Guest host: Christian Burgos Mujakic is absent from the studio panel
105	May 7, 2020	Justin Harvey (South Africa), Pierce Conran (Ireland)	Guest host: Andreas Special appearance by Darcy Paquet
106	May 14, 2020	Justin Harvey (South Africa), Lucky (India)	Guest host: Andreas
107	May 21, 2020	David & Stephanie Rowe (Note: David Rowe represents the Rowe family on the studio panel in episodes where they appear, except in episode 142.) (U.S.), Chris Johnson (U.S.)	Guest host: Christian Burgos
108	May 28, 2020	Armin Mujakic (Austria) & Philip Hellquist (Sweden), Alessandro (Spain)	Guest host: Jang Min Philip is absent from the studio panel
109	June 4, 2020	Jonathan Prout (U.S.), Matthew Douma (Canada)	Guest host: Ilya Belyakov
110	June 11, 2020	Steven (Netherlands), Andreas (Greece) & Justin (South Africa)	
111	June 18, 2020	Maxim (Russia), Blair (Australia)	Guest host: Tyler Rasch
112	June 25, 2020	David & Stephanie Rowe (U.S.)	Guest hosts: Jang Min & Ilya Belyakov
113	July 2, 2020	Armin Mujakic (Austria) & Philip Hellquist (Sweden), Gerson (Chile)	
114	July 9, 2020	Anton (Sweden), Andreas (Greece) & Justin (South Africa)	Special look into IKEA Korea office (Anton)
115	July 16, 2020	Fabien (France), David & Stephanie Rowe (U.S.)	Guest host: Jo Seung-yeon Fabien attempts the Korean History Proficiency Test
116	July 23, 2020	Daniel Tudor (UK), David & Stephanie Rowe (U.S.)	Guest hosts: Christian Burgos, Chris Johnson (Note: Chris Johnson stood in on the studio panel for David Rowe, who was absent due to scheduling conflict with his military job.) David is absent from the studio panel
117	July 30, 2020	Greg (U.S.), David & Stephanie Rowe (U.S.)	Guest host: Young Tak
118	August 6, 2020	Paolo (Italy), Ivan (Italy)	Guest host: Irene
119	August 13, 2020	Joseph (Germany), Chris Johnson (U.S.)	Guest host: Daniel Lindemann Special look into KAIST research facility (Joseph) & special appearance by Andreas (Chris)
120	August 20, 2020	Soledad & Florencia (Argentina)	Guest host: Christian Burgos
121	August 27, 2020	Jonathan Prout (U.S.), David Gerry (U.S.)	Guest host: Han Hyun-min
122	September 3, 2020	Armin Mujakic (Austria), Philip Hellquist (Sweden) & Bruno (Brazil)	
123	September 10, 2020	Pierce Conran (Ireland) with Jason (UK), Marc (Canada) & Patrick (U.S.)	"Korean Film Tour" (Note: These episodes introduce Pierce's friends who also live in Korea. The four plan their film-themed trip together, resembling the original show format before the COVID-19 pandemic.) Guest hosts: Ju Seong-chul (ep. 123–124), Ilya Belyakov (ep. 123), Kim So-hye (ep. 124) Only Pierce is present on the studio panel
124	September 17, 2020	Pierce Conran (Ireland) with Jason (UK), Marc (Canada) & Patrick (U.S.)	"Korean Film Tour" Guest hosts: Ju Seong-chul (ep. 123–124), Ilya Belyakov (ep. 123), Kim So-hye (ep. 124) Only Pierce is present on the studio panel
125	September 24, 2020	Allen (Norway) & Milla (Finland), Victoire (France)	
126	October 1, 2020	Paolo (Italy), Jeannie (U.S.)	Guest host: Chris Johnson
127	October 8, 2020	Fabian, Alvaro & Asier (Spain)	"Daebu-do Tour" Guest host: Alejandro Only Fabian is present on the studio panel
128	October 15, 2020	Jason (UK) & Patrick (U.S.), Brendan (U.S.)	
129	October 22, 2020	Jason Boutte (U.S.) (CEO of food delivery service Shuttle)	Guest host: Christian Burgos Last episode for main host Shin A-young
130	October 29, 2020	Hoermann (France), Jonathan Prout (U.S.)	Guest host: Chris Johnson First episode for main host Park Ji-min Special look into LG Electronics head office (Hoermann)
131	November 5, 2020	James Hooper (UK) with Alberto, Paolo (Italy) & Eugene (Moldova)	"Human-Powered Danyang Tour" (Note: James Hooper, who successfully travelled from the North Pole to the South Pole using only human and natural power in 2007, challenges his friends to a 26.8km tour of Danyang without using machine power such as cars. The course covers 17.1km by mountain bike, followed by 2.5km of standup paddleboarding and a final 7.2km marathon.) Guest host: Christian Burgos Eugene is absent from the studio panel
132	November 12, 2020	Vilppu (Finland)	Guest hosts: Christian Burgos, Leo Ranta Newlywed Vilppu returns to Korea with his Korean wife to visit her family
133	November 19, 2020	Graham Nelson (UK), Vilppu (Note: Vilppu's segment continues from the previous episode.) (Finland)	Guest hosts: James Hooper, Ekaterina Special look into the British Embassy (Graham), with special appearance by Ban Ki-moon
134	November 26, 2020	Andreas (Greece) & Justin (South Africa), Fabrizio Ferrari (Italy)	
135	December 3, 2020	Fabrizio Ferrari (Italy)	Guest host: Paolo Special appearance by Baek Jong-won
136	December 10, 2020	Vilppu with Leo & Jouni (Finland)	"A Special Trip to Andong" Vilppu visits the ancestral hometown of his wife's family; Jouni is absent from the studio panel
137	December 17, 2020	David & Stephanie Rowe (U.S.)	"Trip to Jeongeup" Guest hosts: James Hooper, Christian Burgos
138	December 24, 2020	Michael Ebbesen (Denmark) (General Manager of Lego Korea)	Guest hosts: David Rowe, Christian Burgos Special look into Lego Korea office
139	December 31, 2020	Jason (UK) & Patrick (U.S.), Ekaterina (Note: The studio panel for Ekaterina's segment was filmed together with episode 133, which featured Graham Nelson and James Hooper.) (Russia)	Guest hosts: Graham Nelson, James Hooper
140 (Note: Alberto Mondi was absent from filming due to self-quarantine after visiting a COVID-19 hotspot.)	January 7, 2021	Vilppu (Finland)	"Ten Flavours of Daegu" Tour (Vilppu) Guest hosts: Kim Min-kyung, Leo Ranta (Note: Leo Ranta stood in on the studio panel for his friend Vilppu.) Vilppu is absent from the studio panel
141 (Note: Alberto Mondi returns to filming after testing negative for COVID-19.)	January 14, 2021	David & Stephanie Rowe (U.S.), Vilppu (Finland)	"Ten Flavours of Daegu" Tour (Vilppu) Guest hosts: Kim Min-kyung, Leo Ranta Vilppu is absent from the studio panel
142	January 21, 2021	David & Stephanie Rowe (U.S.)	"Trip to Gochang" Guest host: Eva Popiel Stephanie appears on the studio panel for the first time, in place of her husband
143	January 28, 2021	Vilppu (Finland)	Guest hosts: Leo Ranta, (Note: Leo Ranta stood in on the studio panel for his friend Vilppu.) Christian Burgos Vilppu's last day in Korea before returning to Finland with his wife; he is absent from the studio panel
144	February 4, 2021	Julien Horvilleur (France) (General Manager of L'Oréal Professionnel Korea)	Guest host: Aurelien Loubert Special look into L'Oréal Korea office Episode ends with footage from Vilppu in Finland
145	February 11, 2021	Eoin Stanley (Ireland), Jonathan Prout (U.S.)	Guest host: Lucky
146	February 18, 2021	Paolo (Italy) with Steven (U.S.) & Eugene (Moldova)	"Trip to Pyeongchang" Eugene is absent from the studio panel
147	February 25, 2021	David & Stephanie Rowe(U.S.)	Guest host: Petri Kalliola
148 (Note: DinDin was absent from filming due to scheduling conflict.)	March 4, 2021	Katy (Austria), Fabien (France)	Guest host: Paolo (Note: Paolo stood in on the studio panel for Katy, who attended the same university as him.) Fabien challenges himself to create a Korean font; Katy is absent from the studio panel
149	March 11, 2021	Fabien (France), Dustin Nippert (U.S.)	Guest host: Petri Kalliola
150	March 18, 2021	Brad Little (U.S.) (Musical actor and cast of Cats)	Guest host: Hong Ji-min Exclusive look behind the scenes of the Cats musical production
151	March 25, 2021	Peter (UK), Sushant (India)	Guest host: Christian Burgos Special look into Liverpool FC International Academy Korea (Peter) and International Vaccine Institute headquarters (Sushant)
152	April 1, 2021	Joseph Lidgerwood (Australia)	Guest host: Fabrizio Ferrari
153	April 8, 2021	Theo Agate, Alexandre Blin & Alexandre Artemenko (France) (Musical actors and cast of Les Misérables)	"Les Misérables French Actors' Trip" (Note: This trip marks the show's first return to the original concept of a foreigner's first trip to Korea since the start of the COVID-19 pandemic, as the Les Misérables cast featured had not visited Korea previously.) Guest hosts: Robin Deiana (ep. 153), Andreas (ep. 154), Christian Burgos (ep. 155) Artemeneko is absent from the studio panel
154	April 15, 2021	Theo Agate, Alexandre Blin & Alexandre Artemenko (France) (Musical actors and cast of Les Misérables)	"Les Misérables French Actors' Trip" Guest hosts: Robin Deiana (ep. 153), Andreas (ep. 154), Christian Burgos (ep. 155) Artemeneko is absent from the studio panel
155	April 22, 2021	Theo Agate, Alexandre Blin & Alexandre Artemenko (France) (Musical actors and cast of Les Misérables)	"Les Misérables French Actors' Trip" Guest hosts: Robin Deiana (ep. 153), Andreas (ep. 154), Christian Burgos (ep. 155) Artemeneko is absent from the studio panel
156	April 29, 2021	James Hooper (UK) with Dustin Nippert, Jonathan Prout & David Rowe (U.S.)	"3 Peaks Challenge" Special (Note: James Hooper first mentioned this goal in episode 131. The ambitious project took 6 months of preparation, with James recruiting 3 fellow regular guests of the show as part of his team.) Conquer the three tallest mountain peaks of Korea (Seoraksan, Jirisan, Hallasan) in 24 hours! Guest hosts: Um Hong-gil (ep. 156), Sean (ep. 158)
157	May 6, 2021	James Hooper (UK) with Dustin Nippert, Jonathan Prout & David Rowe (U.S.)	"3 Peaks Challenge" Special Conquer the three tallest mountain peaks of Korea (Seoraksan, Jirisan, Hallasan) in 24 hours! Guest hosts: Um Hong-gil (ep. 156), Sean (ep. 158)
158	May 13, 2021	James Hooper (UK) with Dustin Nippert, Jonathan Prout & David Rowe (U.S.)	"3 Peaks Challenge" Special Conquer the three tallest mountain peaks of Korea (Seoraksan, Jirisan, Hallasan) in 24 hours! Guest hosts: Um Hong-gil (ep. 156), Sean (ep. 158)
159	May 20, 2021	James Hooper (UK) with Dustin Nippert, Jonathan Prout & David Rowe (U.S.)	"3 Peaks Challenge" Special Conquer the three tallest mountain peaks of Korea (Seoraksan, Jirisan, Hallasan) in 24 hours! Guest hosts: Um Hong-gil (ep. 156), Sean (ep. 158)
160	May 27, 2021	Joseph Lidgerwood (Australia), David & Stephanie Rowe (U.S.)	Guest host: Jonathan Prout (Note: Jonathan Prout stood in on the studio panel for David Rowe.) David is absent from the studio panel
161	June 3, 2021	Joseph Lidgerwood (Australia), David & Stephanie Rowe (U.S.)	Guest host: Chris Johnson
162	June 10, 2021	David & Stephanie Rowe (U.S.)	"Field Trip to Gangneung" Guest hosts: Chris Johnson & Christian Burgos (ep. 162), Julian Quintart (ep. 163)
163	June 17, 2021	David & Stephanie Rowe (U.S.)	"Field Trip to Gangneung" Guest hosts: Chris Johnson & Christian Burgos (ep. 162), Julian Quintart (ep. 163)
164	June 24, 2021	Andreas (Greece), David & Stephanie Rowe (U.S.)	Guest host: Christian Burgos
165	July 1, 2021	Justin (South Africa), Andreas (Greece) and Dimitri (France)	"3 Peace Challenge" Justin's unique spin-off of James Hooper's "3 Peaks Challenge" Dimitri is absent from the studio panel Last episode for main hosts Kim Jun-hyun, DinDin and Park Ji-min
166 (Note: First episode for main host Do Kyung-wan)	July 8, 2021	Petri Kalliola, Vilppu, Sami & Ville (Finland)	"Vilppu's Diner" Special Our Finnish friends challenge their dream of opening a Korean cuisine restaurant! Guest hosts: Kim Min-kyung & Hong Ji-yoon (ep. 166–173), Leo Ranta (ep. 170–172)
167	July 15, 2021	Petri Kalliola, Vilppu, Sami & Ville (Finland)	"Vilppu's Diner" Special Our Finnish friends challenge their dream of opening a Korean cuisine restaurant! Guest hosts: Kim Min-kyung & Hong Ji-yoon (ep. 166–173), Leo Ranta (ep. 170–172)
168	July 22, 2021	Petri Kalliola, Vilppu, Sami & Ville (Finland)	"Vilppu's Diner" Special Our Finnish friends challenge their dream of opening a Korean cuisine restaurant! Guest hosts: Kim Min-kyung & Hong Ji-yoon (ep. 166–173), Leo Ranta (ep. 170–172)
169	July 29, 2021	Petri Kalliola, Vilppu, Sami & Ville (Finland)	"Vilppu's Diner" Special Our Finnish friends challenge their dream of opening a Korean cuisine restaurant! Guest hosts: Kim Min-kyung & Hong Ji-yoon (ep. 166–173), Leo Ranta (ep. 170–172)
170 (Note: Alberto Mondi was absent from filming for 3 episodes as he was under quarantine after coming in contact with a COVID-19 patient. Leo Ranta stood in as a guest host in his place.)	August 5, 2021	Petri Kalliola, Vilppu, Sami & Ville (Finland)	"Vilppu's Diner" Special Our Finnish friends challenge their dream of opening a Korean cuisine restaurant! Guest hosts: Kim Min-kyung & Hong Ji-yoon (ep. 166–173), Leo Ranta (ep. 170–172)
171	August 12, 2021	Petri Kalliola, Vilppu, Sami & Ville (Finland)	"Vilppu's Diner" Special Our Finnish friends challenge their dream of opening a Korean cuisine restaurant! Guest hosts: Kim Min-kyung & Hong Ji-yoon (ep. 166–173), Leo Ranta (ep. 170–172)
172	August 19, 2021	Petri Kalliola, Vilppu, Sami & Ville (Finland)	"Vilppu's Diner" Special Our Finnish friends challenge their dream of opening a Korean cuisine restaurant! Guest hosts: Kim Min-kyung & Hong Ji-yoon (ep. 166–173), Leo Ranta (ep. 170–172)
173 (Note: Alberto Mondi returns to filming after completing his quarantine period safely.)	August 26, 2021	Petri Kalliola, Vilppu, Sami & Ville (Finland)	"Vilppu's Diner" Special Our Finnish friends challenge their dream of opening a Korean cuisine restaurant! Guest hosts: Kim Min-kyung & Hong Ji-yoon (ep. 166–173), Leo Ranta (ep. 170–172)
174	September 2, 2021	David & Stephanie Rowe (U.S.)	Guest host: Jonathan Prout First episode for main host Jang Do-yeon
175	September 9, 2021	Aleksandr (Russia), Lea Moreau (France)	
176	September 16, 2021	Justin (South Africa), Felix (UK) & Dimitri (France)	"Chuseok Cooking Challenge" Dimitri is absent from the studio panel
177	September 24, 2021	Aaron Cossrow (U.S.), Guillaume (France)	
178	September 30, 2021	Alberto Mondi, Paolo & Teo (Italy)	"Alberto's Korean Noodle Road" The Italian trio are in Gangwon Province to try all kinds of noodles Korea has to offer!
179	October 7, 2021	Aaron Gall (U.S.), Kevin (France)	
180	October 14, 2021	David & Stephanie Rowe (U.S.)	"Happy Oliver Day" The Rowes celebrate Oliver's graduation from daycare to kindergarten
181	October 21, 2021	David & Stephanie Rowe (U.S.)	"Happy Oliver Day" The Rowes celebrate Oliver's graduation from daycare to kindergarten
182	October 28, 2021	Austin Givens (U.S.) (YouTuber, "Eating What is Given")	
183	November 4, 2021	Anupam Tripathi (India) (Actor from Netflix series Squid Game)	
184	November 11, 2021	Joseph Lidgerwood (Australia) & David Rowe (U.S.)	
185	November 18, 2021	Jonathan Prout (U.S.), Daniel Lindemann (Germany) & Alberto Mondi (Italy)	"Peace Tour in Cheorwon" Jonathan visits historically significant places with his friends to see the lasting impact of the Korean War, which his grandfather fought in
186	November 25, 2021	David & Stephanie Rowe (U.S.)	
187	December 2, 2021	Alberto Mondi, Paolo & Teo (Italy)	
188	December 9, 2021	James Hooper (UK) with Dustin Nippert, Jonathan Prout & David Rowe (U.S.)	"Wild Camping Trip" The "3 Peaks Challenge" members reunite for another wild nature adventure on the island Soyado Dustin Nippert & David Rowe are absent from the studio panel
189	December 16, 2021	James Hooper (UK) with Dustin Nippert, Jonathan Prout & David Rowe (U.S.)	"Wild Camping Trip" The "3 Peaks Challenge" members reunite for another wild nature adventure on the island Soyado Dustin Nippert & David Rowe are absent from the studio panel
190	December 23, 2021	Francinne & Luka (Brazil)	Francinne is absent from the studio panel Episode ends with Christmas greeting videos from previous guests in their respective countries
191	December 30, 2021	Austin Givens (U.S.), Teo (Italy) & Joseph Lidgerwood (Australia)	
192	January 6, 2022	Andreas (Greece), Dimitri & Kevin (France)	"New Year Special" Dimitri is absent from the studio panel
193	January 13, 2022	Jonathan Groff (U.S.)	Guest host: Sean Lee Jonathan trains with his friends for a Strongman competition
194	January 20, 2022	Amar (Mongolia) & Adriana (Italy) (Note: Both previously appeared on episode 183 as friends of actor Anupam Tripathi.)	
195	January 27, 2022	Alberto Mondi (Italy), Christian Burgos (Mexico), Jonathan (Congo) & Sujan Shakya (Nepal)	"Seollal Special"
196	February 3, 2022	Nataly Borges (Brazil) (Vice President of Oriental Brewery)	
197	February 10, 2022	Austin Givens (U.S.), Teo (Italy) & Joseph Lidgerwood (Australia)	Joseph is absent from the studio panel
198	February 17, 2022	Brandon (U.S.), Irene (Spain)	Guest host: Christian Burgos (Note: Christian Burgos stood in for Alberto Mondi, who was absent due to self-quarantine after coming into close contact with a COVID-19 patient.)
199	February 24, 2022	Felix (UK), Daniel Lindemann (Germany) & Alberto Mondi (Italy)	Guest host: Christian Burgos
200	March 3, 2022	Chambo (Australia) and Sarah (U.S.)	
201	March 10, 2022	Julian Quintart (Belgium), Przem (Poland), Ilya (Russia) and Zahid Hussain (Pakistan)	
202	March 17, 2022	Guillaume Patry (Canada), Jeremy (France) and Alejandro (Mexico)	Guest host: Ke Sung Anderson Only Jeremy is present on the studio panel
203	March 24, 2022	Rodrigo (Brazil), Chris (South Africa)	
204	March 31, 2022	David Buchanan (U.S.)(Pitcher for Samsung Lions)	Guest host: Ashley (David's wife), Kevin Dockry David is absent from the studio panel
205	April 7, 2022	Oskar Zijlmans (Sweden)	Guest host: Daniel (Norway), Klara (Sweden)
206	April 14, 2022	David & Stephanie Rowe (U.S.)	
207	April 21, 2022	Omari Spellman (of Anyang KGC) (U.S.), Zeno Slamet (South Africa)	Guest host: Lee Seung-Jun Omari Spellman is absent from the studio panel
208	April 28, 2022	David Buchanan (U.S.)(Pitcher for Samsung Lions)	Guest host: Ashley (David's wife), Kevin Dockry David is absent from the studio panel
209	May 5, 2022	David & Stephanie Rowe (U.S.)	"Children's Day Special"Guest host: Chris Johnson The Rowes are absent from the studio panel
210	May 12, 2022	Anna (Poland)	
211	May 19, 2022	David & Stephanie Rowe (U.S.)	Guest host: Chris Johnson The Rowes are absent from the studio panel
212	May 26, 2022	Guillaume Patry (Canada), Alberto Mondi (Italy), Sujan Shakya (Nepal) & Daniel Lindemann (Germany)	
213	June 2, 2022	Clovis and Max (France), James (U.S.)	
214	June 9, 2022	Jonathan Prout (U.S.)	
215	June 16, 2022	Oskar Zijlmans (Sweden)	Guest host: Alicia, Marcus, Klara.
216	June 23, 2022	Anna (Poland)	Guest host: Ke Sung Anderson
217	June 30, 2022	Alberto Mondi, Paolo (Italy) and Felix (UK)	Final episode of the "Living in Korea" special format Final episode for hosts Do Kyung-wan and Jang Do-yeon

==== Reboot (2022 ~ 2025) ====
As government regulations on entry into South Korea and on-arrival quarantine eased in 2022, the show was able to return to its original premise of foreigners visiting the country for the first time. This reboot of the original concept started airing from July 2022, with host Kim Jun-hyun returning to the studio panel alongside new host Lee Hyun-yi.

Episode	Broadcast date	Guest	Friends	Guest and friends' nationality
218	July 7, 2022	Florian Krapf	Wolfgang, Lucas, Felix	Germany
219	July 14, 2022	Florian Krapf	Wolfgang, Lucas, Felix	Germany
220	July 21, 2022	Florian Krapf	Wolfgang, Lucas, Felix	Germany
221	July 28, 2022	Florian Krapf	Wolfgang, Lucas, Felix	Germany
222	August 4, 2022	Florian Krapf	Wolfgang, Lucas, Felix	Germany
223	August 11, 2022	Samy Rashad	Mohamed, Tarek, Ahmed	Egypt
224	August 18, 2022	Samy Rashad	Mohamed, Tarek, Ahmed	Egypt
225	August 25, 2022	Samy Rashad	Mohamed, Tarek, Ahmed	Egypt
226	September 1, 2022	Samy Rashad	Mohamed, Tarek, Ahmed	Egypt
227	September 8, 2022	Martin	Lucas, Manuel, Miguel	Argentina
228	September 15, 2022	Martin	Lucas, Manuel, Miguel	Argentina
229	September 22, 2022	Martin	Lucas, Manuel, Miguel	Argentina
230	September 29, 2022	Martin	Lucas, Manuel, Miguel	Argentina
231	October 6, 2022	Andy	Steve, Richard, David	New Zealand
232	October 13, 2022	Andy	Steve, Richard, David	New Zealand
233	October 20, 2022	Andy	Steve, Richard, David	New Zealand
234	October 27, 2022	Andy	Steve, Richard, David	New Zealand
235	November 3, 2022	Andy	Steve, Richard, David	New Zealand
236	November 10, 2022	Cady	Astrid, Mia, Lucia	Austria
237	November 17, 2022	Cady	Astrid, Mia, Lucia	Austria
238	November 24, 2022	Cady	Astrid, Mia, Lucia	Austria
239	December 1, 2022	David	Joel, Emil, Aleksander	Sweden
240	December 8, 2022	David	Joel, Emil, Aleksander	Sweden
241	December 15, 2022	David	Joel, Emil, Aleksander	Sweden
242	December 22, 2022	David	Joel, Emil, Aleksander	Sweden
243	December 29, 2022	David	Joel, Emil, Aleksander	Sweden
244	January 5, 2023	Fabrizio Ferrari	Pierre, Nicola, Lele	Italy
245	January 12, 2023	Fabrizio Ferrari	Pierre, Nicola, Lele	Italy
246	January 19, 2023	Fabrizio Ferrari	Pierre, Nicola, Lele	Italy
247	January 26, 2023	Fabrizio Ferrari	Pierre, Nicola, Lele	Italy
248	February 2, 2023	Evan	Alexander, Ian, Augustin (Augi)	Canada
249	February 9, 2023	Evan	Alexander, Ian, Augustin (Augi)	Canada
250	February 16, 2023	Evan	Alexander, Ian, Augustin (Augi)	Canada
251	February 23, 2023	Evan	Alexander, Ian, Augustin (Augi)	Canada
252	March 2, 2023	Tim	Lee, Kevin (Kev), Robbie	United Kingdom
253	March 9, 2023	Tim	Lee, Kevin (Kev), Robbie	United Kingdom
254	March 16, 2023	Tim	Lee, Kevin (Kev), Robbie	United Kingdom
255	March 23, 2023	Tim	Lee, Kevin (Kev), Robbie	United Kingdom
256	March 30, 2023	Jorge	Mark, Joan, Ruben	Spain
257	April 6, 2023	Jorge	Mark, Joan, Ruben	Spain
258	April 13, 2023	Jorge	Mark, Joan, Ruben	Spain
259	April 20, 2023	Jorge	Mark, Joan, Ruben	Spain
260	April 27, 2023	Philipp	Greggo, Lucas, Georg	Switzerland
261	May 4, 2023	Philipp	Greggo, Lucas, Georg	Switzerland
262	May 11, 2023	Philipp	Greggo, Lucas, Georg	Switzerland
263	May 18, 2023	Philipp	Greggo, Lucas, Georg	Switzerland
264	May 25, 2023	Christian Burgos	Marcello (Christian's Dad), Dario, Humberto, Luiz	Mexico
265	June 1, 2023	Christian Burgos	Marcello (Christian's Dad), Dario, Humberto, Luiz	Mexico
266	June 8, 2023	Christian Burgos	Marcello (Christian's Dad), Dario, Humberto, Luiz	Mexico
267	June 15, 2023	Christian Burgos	Marcello (Christian's Dad), Dario, Humberto, Luiz	Mexico
268	June 22, 2023	Andy	Neville (Dad), Fiona (Mom), Steve, Richard, David	New Zealand
269	June 29, 2023	Andy	Neville (Dad), Fiona (Mom), Steve, Richard, David	New Zealand
270	July 6, 2023	Andy	Neville (Dad), Fiona (Mom), Steve, Richard, David	New Zealand
271	July 13, 2023	Andy	Neville (Dad), Fiona (Mom), Steve, Richard, David	New Zealand
272	July 20, 2023	Andy	Neville (Dad), Fiona (Mom), Steve, Richard, David	New Zealand
273	July 27, 2023	David O'Serlivan	Kevin, Ciaran, James	Ireland
274	August 3, 2023	David O'Serlivan	Kevin, Ciaran, James	Ireland
275	August 10, 2023	David O'Serlivan	Kevin, Ciaran, James	Ireland
276	August 17, 2023	David O'Serlivan	Kevin, Ciaran, James	Ireland
277	August 24, 2023	John & Mac (United States)	"Welcome back, Three Wales Brothers!" Ben, Harry, Jack, Georgina (Mom)	United Kingdom (Wales)
278	August 31, 2023	John & Mac (United States)	"Welcome back, Three Wales Brothers!" Ben, Harry, Jack, Georgina (Mom)	United Kingdom (Wales)
279	September 7, 2023	John & Mac (United States)	"Welcome back, Three Wales Brothers!" Ben, Harry, Jack, Georgina (Mom)	United Kingdom (Wales)
280	September 14, 2023	Abaillo	Flamen, Tihomir, Zulatco	Bulgaria
281	September 21, 2023	Abaillo	Flamen, Tihomir, Zulatco	Bulgaria
282	September 28, 2023	Abaillo	Flamen, Tihomir, Zulatco	Bulgaria
283	October 5, 2023	Abaillo	Flamen, Tihomir, Zulatco	Bulgaria
284	October 12, 2023	Daniel	Gabriel, Lafael, Mikael	Brazil
285	October 19, 2023	Daniel	Gabriel, Lafael, Mikael	Brazil
286	October 26, 2023	Daniel	Gabriel, Lafael, Mikael	Brazil
287	November 2, 2023	Daniel	Gabriel, Lafael, Mikael	Brazil
288	November 9, 2023	Daniel	Gabriel, Lafael, Mikael	Brazil
289	November 16, 2023	Forpirio Family	Forpirio (Forpi), Elmer, Forpi Jr.	Bolivia
290	November 23, 2023	Forpirio Family	Forpirio (Forpi), Elmer, Forpi Jr.	Bolivia
291	November 30, 2023	Forpirio Family	Forpirio (Forpi), Elmer, Forpi Jr.	Bolivia
292	December 7, 2023	Forpirio Family	Forpirio (Forpi), Elmer, Forpi Jr.	Bolivia
293	December 14, 2023	Joy Albright	Chris Merolla, Adrian Gonjalles	United States
294	December 21, 2023	Joy Albright	Chris Merolla, Adrian Gonjalles	United States
295	December 28, 2023	Joy Albright	Chris Merolla, Adrian Gonjalles	United States
296	January 4, 2024	Joy Albright	Chris Merolla, Adrian Gonjalles	United States
297	January 11, 2024	Sam Ryder	"Sam Ryder Special" Sam Ryder, Louis Nelsen, Carlin Smith	United Kingdom
298	January 18, 2024	Naden	Josese, Joseba, Joshua	Fiji
299	January 25, 2024	Naden	Josese, Joseba, Joshua	Fiji
300	February 1, 2024	Naden	Josese, Joseba, Joshua	Fiji
301	February 8, 2024	Naden	Josese, Joseba, Joshua	Fiji
302	February 15, 2024	Lasmus	William, Yulius, Felix	Denmark
303	February 22, 2024	Lasmus	William, Yulius, Felix	Denmark
304	February 29, 2024	Lasmus	William, Yulius, Felix	Denmark
305	March 7, 2024	Lasmus	William, Yulius, Felix	Denmark
306	March 14, 2024	Lasmus	William, Yulius, Felix	Denmark
307	March 28, 2024 (Note: This episode closed week later.)	Francesco	Federico Revolde, Danielle Fane	Italy
308	April 4, 2024	Francesco	Federico Revolde, Danielle Fane	Italy
309	April 11, 2024	Francesco	Federico Revolde, Danielle Fane	Italy
310	April 18, 2024	Francesco	Federico Revolde, Danielle Fane	Italy
311	April 25, 2024	Kani	Jeremie, Timothe, Alexis	France
312	May 2, 2024	Kani	Jeremie, Timothe, Alexis	France
313	May 9, 2024	Kani	Jeremie, Timothe, Alexis	France
314	May 16, 2024	Kani	Jeremie, Timothe, Alexis	France
315	May 23, 2024	Kani	Jeremie, Timothe, Alexis	France
316	May 30, 2024	Tommy	David, Lenato, Richard	Hungary
317	June 6, 2024	Tommy	David, Lenato, Richard	Hungary
318	June 13, 2024	Tommy	David, Lenato, Richard	Hungary
319	June 20, 2024	Tommy	David, Lenato, Richard	Hungary
320	June 27, 2024	Alexandros Jang	Christos, Harris, Constantinos	Greece
321	July 4, 2024	Alexandros Jang	Christos, Harris, Constantinos	Greece
322	July 11, 2024	Alexandros Jang	Christos, Harris, Constantinos	Greece
323	July 18, 2024	Alexandros Jang	Christos, Harris, Constantinos	Greece
324	July 25, 2024	Alan Walker	"Alan Walker Special" Alan Walker, Robin Pakalen, Vikram Sing Ban (Vikkstar)	Norway; Finland; United Kingdom
325	August 1, 2024	Benedict	Chris, Adrian, Aleandro	Malta
326	August 8, 2024	Benedict	Chris, Adrian, Aleandro	Malta
327	August 15, 2024	Benedict	Chris, Adrian, Aleandro	Malta
328	August 22, 2024	Benedict	Chris, Adrian, Aleandro	Malta
329	August 29, 2024	Benedict	Chris, Adrian, Aleandro	Malta
330	September 5, 2024		"Eating Taxi" Special Pernando & Talia, Hailey Weiss, Will Hyde & Jonadan	Spain & Mexico; United States; Australia
331	September 12, 2024		"Eating Taxi" Special Pernando & Talia, Hailey Weiss, Will Hyde & Jonadan	Spain & Mexico; United States; Australia
332	September 19, 2024		"Talking Show" Special Nicolas & Matias, Matthew & Adrian	Germany (United States); United Kingdom & Brazil
333	September 26, 2024	Jin Sun-Kyu (South Korea)	Igor Pedroso, Luan Broom, J.B. Oliveira	Brazil
334	October 3, 2024	Jin Sun-Kyu (South Korea)	Igor Pedroso, Luan Broom, J.B. Oliveira	Brazil
335	October 10, 2024	Jin Sun-Kyu (South Korea)	Igor Pedroso, Luan Broom, J.B. Oliveira	Brazil
336	October 17, 2024	Jin Sun-Kyu (South Korea)	Igor Pedroso, Luan Broom, J.B. Oliveira	Brazil
337	October 24, 2024		"Gimhae Travel" Special Maejessi Alexi & Faolo Mendoja	France & Peru
338	October 31, 2024		"Gimhae Travel" Special Maejessi Alexi & Faolo Mendoja	France & Peru
339	November 7, 2024	Jacob	Daniel, Jakub, Phillip	Czech
340	November 14, 2024	Jacob	Daniel, Jakub, Phillip	Czech
341	November 21, 2024	Jacob	Daniel, Jakub, Phillip	Czech
342	November 28, 2024	Jacob	Daniel, Jakub, Phillip	Czech
343	December 5, 2024		"Cooking Travel" Special (1) Joseph Lidgerwood & David Rowe	Australia & United States
344	December 12, 2024		"Cooking Travel" Special (1) Joseph Lidgerwood & David Rowe	Australia & United States
345	December 19, 2024		"Cooking Travel" Special (2) Fabrizio Ferrari & Leo Lanta	Italy & Finland
346	December 26, 2024		"Cooking Travel" Special (2) Fabrizio Ferrari & Leo Lanta	Italy & Finland
347	January 2, 2025		"Cooking Travel" Special (2) Fabrizio Ferrari & Leo Lanta	Italy & Finland
348	January 9, 2025	Uestain	Uestain, Yan, Christer	Norway
349	January 16, 2025	Uestain	Uestain, Yan, Christer	Norway
350	January 23, 2025	Uestain	Uestain, Yan, Christer	Norway
351	January 30, 2025	Uestain	Uestain, Yan, Christer	Norway
352	February 6, 2025	Uestain	Uestain, Yan, Christer	Norway
353(2)	February 13, 2025	Uestain	Uestain, Yan, Christer	Norway
354(2)	February 20, 2025	Uestain	Uestain, Yan, Christer	Norway
355(2)	February 27, 2025	Uestain	Uestain, Yan, Christer	Norway
353(1)	February 13, 2025	Max	Roger, Rob, Taine	Netherlands
354(1)	February 20, 2025	Max	Roger, Rob, Taine	Netherlands
355(1)	February 27, 2025	Max	Roger, Rob, Taine	Netherlands
356	March 6, 2025	Max	Roger, Rob, Taine	Netherlands
357	March 13, 2025	Max	Roger, Rob, Taine	Netherlands
358	March 20, 2025	Peter	Adam, Zbuku, Damianeck	Poland
359	March 27, 2025	Peter	Adam, Zbuku, Damianeck	Poland
360	April 3, 2025	Peter	Adam, Zbuku, Damianeck	Poland
361	April 10, 2025	Peter	Adam, Zbuku, Damianeck	Poland
362	April 17, 2025	Miguel	Juse, Thomas, Francisco	Portuguese
363	April 24, 2025	Miguel	Juse, Thomas, Francisco	Portuguese
364	May 1, 2025	Miguel	Juse, Thomas, Francisco	Portuguese
365	May 8, 2025	Miguel	Juse, Thomas, Francisco	Portuguese
366	May 15, 2025	Lasmus	"Bike Road Trip" William, Yulius, Felix, Oliver	Denmark
367	May 22, 2025	Lasmus	"Bike Road Trip" William, Yulius, Felix, Oliver	Denmark
368	May 29, 2025	Lasmus	"Bike Road Trip" William, Yulius, Felix, Oliver	Denmark
369	June 5, 2025	Lasmus	"Bike Road Trip" William, Yulius, Felix, Oliver	Denmark
370	June 12, 2025	Lasmus	"Bike Road Trip" William, Yulius, Felix, Oliver	Denmark
371	June 19, 2025	Lasmus	"Bike Road Trip" William, Yulius, Felix, Oliver	Denmark
372	June 26, 2025	Lasmus	"Bike Road Trip" William, Yulius, Felix, Oliver	Denmark
373	July 3, 2025	Mitch Crayg	Donald, Ramsey, Ross	United Kingdom (Scotland)
374	July 10, 2025	Mitch Crayg	Donald, Ramsey, Ross	United Kingdom (Scotland)
375	July 17, 2025	Mitch Crayg	Donald, Ramsey, Ross	United Kingdom (Scotland)
376	July 24, 2025	Erco	"3 Peaks Challenge 2025" Mae, Hobit, Mango	Estonia
377	July 31, 2025	Erco	"3 Peaks Challenge 2025" Mae, Hobit, Mango	Estonia
378	August 7, 2025	Erco	"3 Peaks Challenge 2025" Mae, Hobit, Mango	Estonia
379	August 14, 2025	Erco	"3 Peaks Challenge 2025" Mae, Hobit, Mango	Estonia
380	August 28, 2025 (Note: This episode closed week later.)	Ryan Weiss & Hailey Weiss	"Weiss Family Special" Mike McPadunn, Amanda McPadunn	United States
381	September 4, 2025	Ryan Weiss & Hailey Weiss	"Weiss Family Special" Mike McPadunn, Amanda McPadunn	United States
382	September 11, 2025	Ryan Weiss & Hailey Weiss	"Weiss Family Special" Mike McPadunn, Amanda McPadunn	United States
383	September 18, 2025	Ryan Weiss & Hailey Weiss	"Weiss Family Special" Mike McPadunn, Amanda McPadunn	United States
384	September 25, 2025	Gumbir Man Shirester	Nabin Lai, Nabin Tamang	Nepal
385	October 3, 2025	Gumbir Man Shirester	Nabin Lai, Nabin Tamang	Nepal
386	October 9, 2025	Gumbir Man Shirester	Nabin Lai, Nabin Tamang	Nepal

== Awards and nominations ==
Year	Award	Category	Nominated work	Result	Ref.
2018	54th Baeksang Arts Awards	Best Entertainment Program	Welcome, First Time in Korea?	Nominated	
2018	18th MBC Entertainment Awards	Special Entertainment Program	Welcome, First Time in Korea?	Won	
2019	55th Baeksang Arts Awards	Best Entertainment Program	Welcome, First Time in Korea?	Nominated	
