= South Korean Foreigners =

South Korean television series

- Genre: Variety, quiz
- Country of origin: South Korea
- Original language: Korean
- No. of seasons: 1
- No. of episodes: 218

Production
- Production location: South Korea
- Camera setup: Multi-camera

Original release
- Network: MBC every1
- Release: October 17, 2018 – December 21, 2022

South Korean Foreigners (Korean: 대한외국인) is a South Korean television show. The show aired every Wednesday at 20:30 (KST) starting from October 17, 2018 to December 21, 2022.

== Cast member ==
- Kim Yong-man (presenter)
- Park Myung-soo
- Han Hyun-min

=== Foreigners ===
- John Rock
- Mack Rock
- Albrecht Huwe
- Angelina Danilova
- Sujan Shakya
- Andreas Varsakopoulos
- Carlos Gorito
- Abhishek Gupta
- Alberto Mondi
- Sam Okyere
- Vida Mohammad
- Moeka Sato
- Kris Johnson
- Lee Eva
- İrem Çıray
