= Love of 7.7 Billion =

- Promotional poster
- Also known as: 7.7 Billion In Love
- Genre: Life; Talk show
- Starring: Shin Dong-yup; Yoo In-na; Kim Hee-chul
- Country of origin: South Korea
- Original language: Korean
- No. of episodes: 12

Original release
- Network: JTBC
- Release: February 10 – April 27, 2020

Love of 7.7 Billion (Korean: 77억의 사랑) is a South Korean show. It aired on JTBC on Monday at 23:00 (KST).

== Format ==
Love of 7.7 Billion is a program where young men and women representing 7.7 billion people around the world share their views on love and marriage.

== Host ==
- Shin Dong-yup
- Yoo In-na
- Kim Hee-chul

== Participation Panel ==
Cast	Country	Gender	Ref.
Tabea Tenberg	Germany	Female	
Angelina Danilova	Russia	Female	
Oumeyma Fatih	Morocco	Female	
Miki	Spain	Female	
Haruta Mizuki	Japan	Female	
Julia Anna Nathalia Barlund	Finland	Female	
Rose Kizgin	France	Female	
Zhang Yi Wen	China	Male	
Zeno Slamet	South Africa	Male	
Joseph Detlef Nemelka	USA	Male	
Joakim Sorensen	Sweden	Male	
Maksim Sukhonosik	Russia	Male	
Aancod Abe Zaccarelli	UK	Male	
Jorge Yahyt Pena Herrera	Colombia	Male	

=== 1-day Panel ===
Cast	Country	Ep. #
Female
Anna	Pakistan	10–12
Male
Saad Al-Qahtani	Saudi Arabia	6
Wen Kai	China	8
Daniel Lindemann	Germany	8

== List of episodes ==
- In the ratings below, the highest rating for the show will be in red, and the lowest rating for the show will be in blue.

Ep. #	Air Date	Subject	Match	Guest(s)	Rating
1	February 10, 2020	Unmarried couples cohabiting	Finland Male vs South Korea Female	DinDin	1.893%
2	February 17, 2020	International dating obstacle	Germany Female vs South Korea Male	Ham So-won	1.741%
3	February 24, 2020	World Wedding	USA Male vs South Korean Female	Kim Won-hyo, Shim Jin-hwa	1.383%
4	March 2, 2020	Opponent's wishes	British Male vs South Korean Female	Jang Young-ran	1.531%
5	March 9, 2020	Using a dating app	Chinese Male vs South Korean Female	Solbi	1.163%
6	March 16, 2020	Prenuptial agreement	UK Male vs South Korean Female	Park Sung-kwang	1.563%
7	March 23, 2020	COVID-19 Special - 1	Swedish Male vs South Korean Female	Alberto Mondi, Tyler Rasch, Sam Okyere	2.075%
8	March 30, 2020	COVID-19 Special - 2	-	Kim Kang-rim, Kim Bo-sung, Park Yeon-mi	2.768%
9	April 6, 2020	Special economic, Single-parent families	Finland Women vs South Korea Male	Roh Ji-hoon	1.910%
10	April 13, 2020	Sex education and sexual crimes in various countries, Nth room case	Belgium Male vs South Korea Female	Hong Seok-cheon, Ahn Hyun-mo	2.047%
11	April 20, 2020	Remarriage, Flaming (Internet)	-	Great library, Yumdaeng	1.434%
12	April 27, 2020	World's House Prices	American Female vs South Korea Male	Lim Young-woong, Young Tak	3.826%
