= Han Hyun-min =

South Korean model and actor (born 2001)

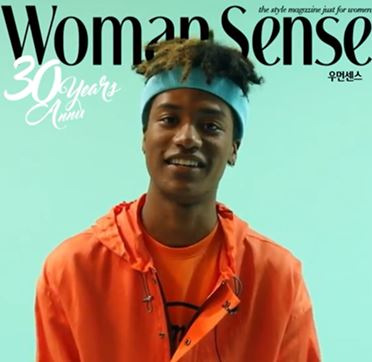
- Han in 2018
- Born: 19 May 2001 (age 25); Seoul, South Korea
- Occupations: Model; actor
- Years active: 2016–present
- Agent: Sublime
- Height: 191 cm (6 ft 3 in)

Korean name
- Hangul: 한현민
- Hanja: 韓炫旻
- RR: Han Hyeonmin
- MR: Han Hyŏnmin

Han Hyun-min (Korean: 한현민; born 19 May 2001) is a South Korean model and actor, who gained national recognition by becoming the first Korean model of African descent to walk the catwalks in South Korea and internationally.

== Early life ==
Han was born in 2001 to a Nigerian father and a Korean mother from the Cheongju Han clan. He was raised in the Itaewon neighborhood of Seoul, where many foreigners in South Korea reside. Growing up in Seoul, Han faced racial discrimination as a biracial child and has publicly spoken up about his experiences.

== Career ==
A modeling agency discovered Han via his Instagram at age 15 while he was still in school. They arranged a meeting and met at a coffee shop where they asked him to walk and signed him on the spot. He quickly became one of Korea's most in-demand models and was named one of TIME Magazine's 30 most influential teens.

In June 2022, Han signed a contract with Sublime.

== Filmography ==
=== Film ===
Year	Title	Role	Notes	Ref.
2022	Special Delivery	Asif / Quick Repair Specialist		

=== Music video appearances ===
Year	Title	Korean Title	Artist
2018	"I Love You"	"난 널 사랑해"	Kim Bum Soo
2018	"Run It"		Jay Park, Woo Won-Jae, Jessi (for Nike)
2019	"Who I Am"		NIve
2021	"Gyopo Hairstyle"	"교포머리"	Peakboy

=== Television series ===
Year	Title	Role	Notes	Ref.
2018	Tale of Fairy	Ethiopian exchange fairy	Cameo, episode 16	
2019	Hip Hop King - Nassna Street	Seo Ki-ha		
2021	So Not Worth It	Hyun-min	Sitcom	

=== Variety shows ===
Year	Title	Notes/Ref.
2017	Radio Star	Guest with Kim Soo-yong, Momoland's JooE, Kwon Hyun-bin, and Hong Seok-cheon, episode 549
2017–2018	My English Puberty	Regular member
2018	Wizard of Nowhere	Guest with Yook Joong-wan (Rose Motel), episodes 21–25
2018	My Little Old Boy	Guest with Yoon Jung-soo, episode 95
2018	Knowing Bros	Guest with Lee Da-hee and Jang Sung-kyu, episode 112
2018	King of Mask Singer	Contestant (Braird Man)
2018	Let's Eat Dinner Together	Guest with Jang Yoon-ju, episode 76
2018	I Can See Your Voice: Season 5	Guest panelist with Microdot, Jang Do-yeon and MeloMance's Kim Min-seok, episode 1
2018	The Return of Superman	Guest, episode 211
2018	Happy Together Season 3	Guest with Abigail Alderete, Sam Okyere, Sazal Kim and Seventeen's Vernon, episode 533
2018	South Korean Foreigners	Regular member
2018	For The First Time In My Life	Main host
2018	Amazing Saturday	Guest with Tyler Rasch, episode 16
2018	1% Friendship	Guest, episode 10
2018	My Neighbor, Charles	Panelist, episode 154
2018–present	My English Puberty Season 2	Guest
2018–2019	Cool Kids	Co-host with Yoo Jae-suk, Kim Shin-young, Red Velvet's Seulgi, Ahn Jung-hwan and Haon
2019	Law of the Jungle	Guest with Jeon So-mi, Matthew Douma, Lee Jung Hyun and Lee Tae-gon
2019–2021	M Countdown	Co-host with Lee Dae-hwi
2019	Boss in the Mirror	Guest with Woo Ji-won, NCT Dream's Na Jae-min, Zhong Chenle, and Park Ji-sung, Lee Hyun-yi and Park Yu-ri, episode 20 and 29
2019	Ask Us Anything Fortune Teller	Main host, episode 2 and 4
2019	Sky Muscle	Guest, episode 15
2019–2020	What is Studying?	Regular member with Shin Dong-yup, Eugene, So Yi-hyun and Ko Seung-jae
2020	TMI News	Guest with Kwon Hyun-bin, episode 47
2020	Hangout with Yoo	Guest with SSAK3, AB6IX's Lee Dae-hwi, Hwang Kwang-hee, Soyou, Teen Top, Eric Nam, Jessi, episode 54
2020	5Bros	Guest with Tony Ahn, Hong Yoon-Hwa and Austin Kang, episode 12
2020	Love On The Air: Season 2	Guest, episode 75
2020	Welcome, First Time in Korea? 2	Guest, episode 121
2021	Learn Way 2	Guest, episode 2
