= Robin Deiana =

French television personality

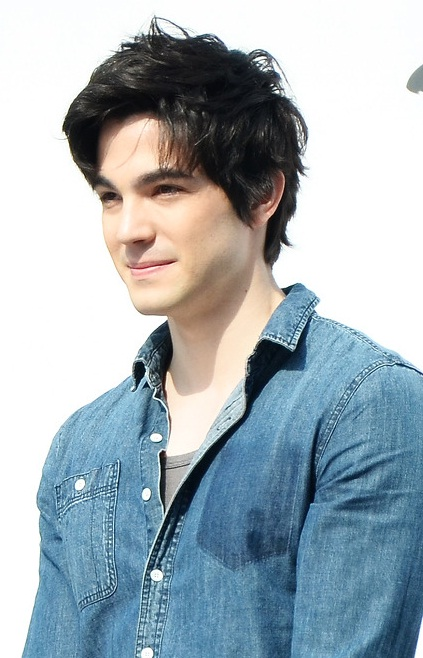
- Deiana in 2014
- Born: July 18, 1990 (age 35); Avallon, Yonne, France
- Occupations: Television personality, model, breakdancer, actor
- Years active: 2013–present
- Spouse: Kim Seo-yeon (m. 2025)
- Website: Robin Deiana on Instagram

Robin Deiana (born July 18, 1990) is a French television personality, actor, model and breakdancer who lives and performs in South Korea. He was a cast member of the talk show Non-Summit. He is also currently a host of the TV show The Most Beautiful Days.

== Personal life ==
Born to an Italian father and a French mother in Avallon, Burgundy, Deiana went to the University of Burgundy in Dijon, studying computer science, and first came to Korea as an exchange student at Konkuk University. He was first interested in the Korean media when he watched X-Man on YouTube when he was in middle school in 2005.

Deiana married Kim Seo-yeon, a former member of LPG, on May 3, 2025.

== Career ==
=== Celebrity and endorsements ===
He and Non-Summit cast member Julian Quintart were honorary ambassadors of the ICLEI world congress global network meeting, appointed by the Seoul Metropolitan Government, two "foreign entertainers" who "gained popularity after appearing on cable network JTBC talk show Non-Summit."

== Filmography ==
=== Television series ===
Year	Title	Network	Role	Notes
2013	Infinite Girls	MBC every1	Himself	1 episode
2014	Non-Summit	JTBC	Himself	cast member
2014	The Most Beautiful Days	MBC every1	Himself	cast member
2014	Please Take Care of My Refrigerator	JTBC	Himself	1 episode
2014	Happy Time	MBC	Himself	cast member
2015	Where Is My Friend's Home	JTBC	Himself	Italy trip
2015	5 Days of Summer	JTBC	Himself	cast member
2015	Our Neighborhood Arts and Physical Education	KBS	Himself	Swimming (Global Team)
2017	Hello Counselor	KBS World	Himself	Episode 310
2017	Welcome, First Time in Korea?	MBC every1	Himself	4 episodes
2018	Sunny Again Tomorrow	KBS	Leo	
2019	Kill It	OCN	Karimov II	

== Discography ==
=== Featured singles ===
Year	Single	Peak Positions	Album
Year	Single	KOR	Album
2014	"Shining Star" Sosim Boys feat. Robin Deiana	–	"Shining Star"
2015	"What Are You Doing?" Crayon Pop feat. Robin Deiana	–	"The Artist Diary Project Part. 11"

== Awards and nominations ==
Name of the award ceremony, year presented, category, nominee of the award, and the result of the nomination
Award ceremony	Year	Category	Nominee / Work	Result	Ref.
Seoul International Drama Awards	2022	Asian Star Award (Korea)	Robin Deiana	Won	
