= Andreas Varsakopoulos =

Greek-American actor (born 1990)

- Ανδρέας Βαρσακόπουλος
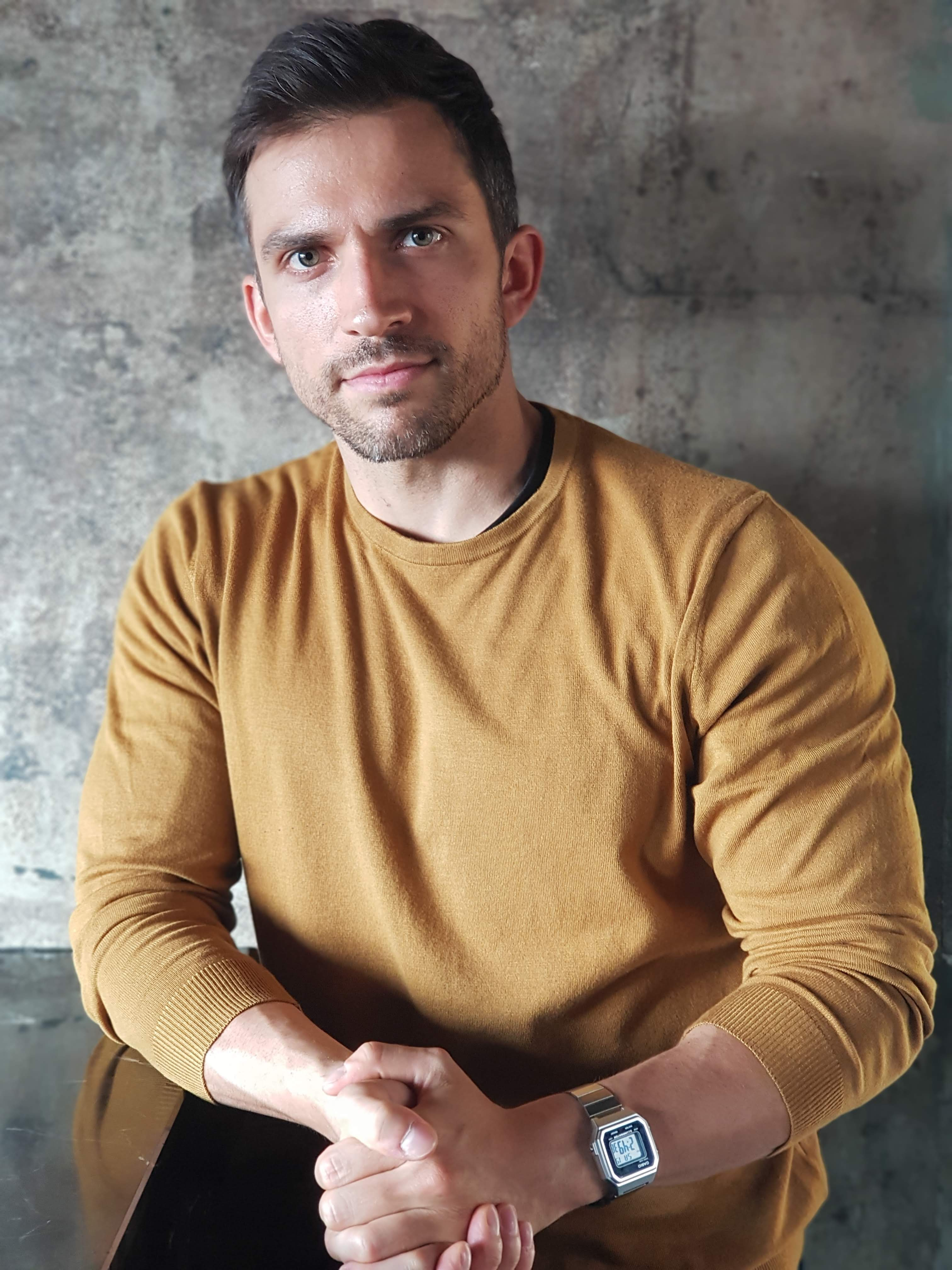
- Varsakopoulos on the set of Koreigner in 2019
- Born: Andreas Jacques Varsakopoulos; 14 August 1990 (age 36); Giannitsa, Pella, Greece
- Education: University of Vermont (BS); University of Massachusetts Boston (MA)
- Occupations: Television personality, personal trainer, lecturer
- Years active: 2012–present
- Height: 180 cm (5 ft 11 in)
- Website: Andreas Varsakopoulos on Instagram

Andreas Jacques Varsakopoulos (Greek: Ανδρέας Βαρσακόπουλος, born 14 August 1990) is a Greek-American who lives and works in Seoul, South Korea as a director, producer, and actor. He was born to a Greek father and an American mother. He is one of very few foreign directors/producers working in the Korean entertainment industry.

== Professional life ==
Varsakopoulos has dual citizenship in the United States and Greece. He attended the University of Vermont for his undergraduate degree, and University of Massachusetts Boston for his master's degree. In the summer of 2012 he moved to South Korea. During his time in Korea he began learning Korean through friends, co-workers and self-study. In the summer of 2015 he first appeared on the television program Non-Summit as the Greek representative.

Following that show, he moved toward music video and commercial production. He has worked on several music videos with A-list Korean celebrities. In 2022, he filmed "CAGE", a short film that received acclaim from critics and received awards from several film festivals including Tokyo Film Awards, Thessaloniki Short Film Festival, and Buncheon Fantastic Film Festival.

Varsakopoulos continues to direct and produce content in Korea and abroad.

== Filmography ==
=== Short films ===
Year	Title	Role	Film Festival Screenings
2022	CAGE	Director	Buncheon Fantastic Film Festival, Thessaloniki Short Film Festival, Tokyo Film awards
2023	TRAP	Cinematographer	Short Shorts Asian Film Festival
2023	The Extra Inning	Director	Pending

=== Music videos ===
Year	Title	Artist	Role	Notes
2022	Again, Dream	Nam Yeong Ju	Assistant Director	
2022	Like it was	Reina	Assistant Director	
2022	Fallen	Seo In-Guk	Director	
2023	3D Official Live Performance Video	Jung Kook	Assistant Director & Producer	

=== Television series ===
Year	Title	Network	Role	Notes
2015	Non-Summit	JTBC	Himself	Cast member
2016	Where Is My Friend's Home	JTBC	Himself	Cast member
2018	South Korean Foreigners	MBC Every 1	Himself	Cast member

=== Commercials ===
Year	Title	Company	Role	Director
2016	BIT salon Series EPISODE 01 - The Job Interview	BIT salon	Main Role	Christian Burgos (México)
2018	Nugu Candle	SK Telecom	Main Role	
