= Abhishek Gupta (television personality) =

Indian actor

- Born: 16 June 1978 (age 47); New Delhi, India
- Occupation: Television personality
- Spouse: Unknown (m. 2025)
- Children: 1
- Website: Abhishek Gupta on Instagram

Abhishek Gupta (Korean: 아비쉐크 굽타; born 16 June 1978), also known as Lucky (럭키), is an Indian who lives and performs in South Korea as a television personality and actor. He was a cast member in the talk-variety show Non-Summit.

Born in New Delhi, India, he graduated from the Department of Economics at the National University of India.

He entered the Republic of Korea on March 24, 1996 and has already worked as a broadcaster and actor in the early 2000s. He is also a businessman who runs Lucky India, a small business and Indian restaurant which also imports Indian sesame seeds.

He appeared 103 to 144 times as a representative of JTBC's "Non-summit" India, and dropped out to prepare to open an Indian restaurant. He appeared on tvN's "Wednesday Food Talk" episode 28 and in the 10th episode of "Thank you for the meal." In the SBS Monday-Tuesday drama "The Age of Wild Men", he played the role of "Major Watekar" of the U.S. Army, which often makes him appear as a supporting character in the composite video of the "Wild Men".

In 2022, he was awarded honorary citizenship of Seoul for his promotion of the city and charity outreach work.

== Abnormal Summit ==
Instead of his real name, he appears under the nickname Lucky. He appeared as India's representative from 103 times in the abnormal talks that were reorganized into season 2.

Since he has relatively more experience in domestic broadcasting than other panels, he is responsible for the gag of season 2 while showing flexible talk without being nervous from the beginning of his appearance. Among the cast of abnormal talks, Sung Si-kyung and Jeon Hyun-moo are the oldest after the oldest of all abnormal representatives.

He is also the oldest brother who is warm hearted because of his age and long life in Korea. Above all, due to the long life in Korea, the pronunciation and intonation are quite natural. Although there may be a lack of vocabulary, the flow of words itself is so close to the level of native speakers that it is hard to tell if they are foreigners if they hear it with their eyes closed.

He may seem like arguing with Zahid Hussein, a Pakistani panel who has an unfriendly relation with India. It may seem like they are in a bad relationship, but both of them are not cranky but sarcastic, and they are at the level of acknowledging reasonable points from the other person and ending them with humor. Rather, the two's discussion tendencies are so gentlemanly that it is difficult to create a tense scene.

On April 10, 2017, he stopped appearing for personal reasons. He later appeared as a guest on the show's announcement on August 7, 2017.

== Personal life ==
On August 15, 2025, Gupta announced his engagement to a Korean woman. It was also announced that the bride-to-be was pregnant. The couple married on September 28, 2025. On January 6, 2026, Gupta's wife gave birth to a daughter.

== Filmography ==
=== Television series ===
Year	Title	Role	Notes
2003	Rustic Period	Major Watekar	
2019	Pegasus Market	Al-sahad Saladin	

=== Television shows ===
Year	Title	Network	Role	Notes/Ref.
2016–2017	Non-Summit	JTBC	Cast member	
2017–2018	Welcome, First Time in Korea?	MBC Every 1	Cast member	
2017–2018	Travelmate	O'live	Cast member	
2018–present	South Korean Foreigners	MBC Every 1	Cast member	
2019	Eurachacha Mansuro	KBS 2TV	Cast member	
2020	King of Mask Singer	MBC	Contestant	as "Kimchi" (ep. 253)
2024	Welcome, First Time in Korea?	MBC Every 1	Special Host	ep. 328, 329

== Awards and nominations ==
Year	Award	Category	Nominated work	Result	Ref.
2019	KBS Entertainment Awards	Best Challenge Award	Eurachacha Mansuro	Won	
