= Vida Mohammad =

Afghan model and YouTuber based in South Korea

Vida 비다 ویدا محمد
- Born: Vida Mohammad; July 20, 1997 (age 28); Islamic Emirate of Afghanistan
- Occupation: Model
- Modeling information
- Height: 165 cm (5 ft 5 in)
- Hair color: Dark brown
- Eye color: Dark brown

Vida Mohammad (Korean: 비다 모하마드; born 20 July 1997) is an Afghan-American model and YouTuber, crypto trading based in South Korea.

== Life and career ==
Vida was born in Afghanistan. Because of the difficult situation there, she and her family soon moved and resided in Russia, and later in Ukraine. Further difficulties led to them being settled as refugees in the United States when she was ten. Vida became interested in Korean culture and moved to South Korea at the age of twenty.

Starting to model in South Korea, Vida gained prominence in the industry and she has been active in entertainment programs since 2020. She has appeared several times on the TV show South Korean Foreigners. She launched a YouTube channel named Vida TV consisting of content about makeup, fashion, and her experiences in the country in a series named When I Open My Eyes In Korea.

After the Taliban takeover of Afghanistan in 2021, Vida appealed for help from the international community. She also commented on a show on MBC TV: "People who worked so hard in Afghanistan are doing nothing right now. They just stay at home. It feels like there is no hope in Afghanistan."
