= A Man Who Feeds The Dog =

- Genre: Observation variety, Reality television
- Country of origin: South Korea
- Original language: Korean
- No. of seasons: 4
- No. of episodes: 118

Production
- Production location: South Korea

Original release
- Network: Channel A
- Release: December 18, 2015 – November 2, 2019

A Man Who Feeds The Dog (Korean: 개밥 주는 남자) was Channel A's entertainment program.

== Broadcast time ==
Broadcast period	Airtime
December 18, 2015 – November 25, 2016	Friday at 23:00
April 29, 2017 – November 11, 2017	Saturday at 21:30
November 18, 2017 – March 31, 2018	Saturday at 22:50
April 8, 2018 – April 22, 2018	Sunday at 20:00
December 2, 2018 – December 23, 2018	Sunday at 20:50
August 17, 2019 – November 2, 2019	Saturday at 19:40

== Season 1 ==
A reality show which follows the lives of four celebrity men who own dogs.

=== Performer ===
- Ju Byeong-jin
- Yang Se-hyung
- Yang Se-chan
- Shin Dong-ho
- Kim Min-jun
- Hyun Joo-yup
- Kangin
- Choi Hwa-jung
- I.O.I

=== Special Cast ===
- Kim Seung-soo
- Dong Hyun Kim
- Kim Hyun-jung
- Chae Yeon
- Min Do-hee
- Choi Jung-yoon
- Lee Young-ha
- Kangta

== Season 2 ==
For the so-called Homo Solitarius, who feel utterly alone in this hectic world, A Man Who Feeds the Dog has come back for its second season. In this season, three hottest celebrities who are nonetheless lonely meet three adorable dogs that will turn their lives upside down. The ultimate expert of pets, Kang Hyung-wook, will guide them through not-so-easy process of getting to know one's pet.

=== Performer ===
- Sunny (Narration)
- Sung Yu-ri (Narration)
- Lee Tae-gon
- Choi Hyun-seok
- Kim Min-kyo
- Kang Hyung-wook
- Lee Geung-young
- Kangta
- Swings
- Lovelyz

=== Special Cast ===
- Go Soo-hee
- Kim Won-hae
- Park Chul-min
- Lee Geun-hee
- Cao Lu
- Heo Young-ji
- Lee Hye-jung
- Samuel
- Jisook
- Dong Hyun Kim
- Kim Jae-woo
- Seo Yu-ri

== Season 3 ==
GUYS AND DOGS returns! In the third season, the show tackles the different theme, the dream that every pet owner must have dreamed for once in a lifetime. Celebrities and their pets challenge themselves to travel to a foreign country. Actors Yoon Jin-suh and Bae Jung-nam and their pets, respectively, take on a trip to abroad. They wander around beautiful cities, enjoy nature, and have a good time. You can feel joyful and happy just watching them enjoy their time together.

=== Performer ===
- Yoon Jin-seo
- Bae Jung-nam

== Season 4 (Global Pet Travel) ==
Your dream of traveling with your pet came true! "Global Pet Travel" project where celebrity and pet travel the world.

=== Performer ===
- Park Si-hoo
- Kim Hee-chul
- Kim Ji-min
- Kim So-hye
- Christian Burgos

== See also ==
- TV Animal Farm
- Dogs Are Incredible
