= Rob Gauntlett =

British adventurer

Robert Douglas "Rob" Gauntlett (10 May 1987 – 9 January 2009) was an English adventurer, explorer and motivational speaker. In 2006 he became the youngest British climber to reach the summit of Everest.

== Early life ==
Gauntlett grew up in Petworth, West Sussex and was educated at Christ's Hospital. After graduating, he cycled from Bilbao to Istanbul with a school friend, Richard Lebon.

== Everest ==
In 2003, with no climbing experience, Gauntlett and another school friend, James Hooper from Somerset, decided to climb Mount Everest. After training in Scotland, the French Alps, on Spantik in Pakistan and Ama Dablam in Nepal, on 17 May 2006 they reached the summit of Everest, Gauntlett becoming the youngest British climber to do so, a week after his 19th birthday. Their climb to the top, via the North side of the mountain was done so in aid of Cancer Research UK.

== Pole to pole ==
Between 8 April 2007 and 9 October 2008 Gauntlett and Hooper made a 180° expedition from North to South Magnetic Poles, using only human and natural power, to help raise awareness of climate change. They travelled by ski, dog sled and sail boat to New York City, by bicycle on to Panama City and then sailed to Guayaquil in Ecuador before resuming on their bicycles for the journey to Punta Arenas, Chile for the very last sea voyage. Having completed the 22,000-mile (35 200 km) trip, the pair sailed 1,800 nautical miles on to Australia.

The expedition helped to raise money for The Prince's Trust, and in November 2008 Gauntlett and Hooper were named as the National Geographic Society's Adventurers of the Year at the Society's headquarters in Washington, D.C.

== Death ==
On the morning of 10 January 2009, a mountain rescue team found the bodies of Gauntlett and his climbing companion, James Atkinson. Both had been killed after accidentally falling whilst ice climbing at Chamonix in the Alps. They had been on holiday in France with Hooper and Richard Lebon, all friends from their school days attending Christ’s Hospital boarding and day school.

The four friends had split into two groups, with Gauntlett and Hooper helping the less experienced other climbers. Gauntlett and Atkinson started their climb earlier than the others. However, when the time came to set off on their climb Hooper thought that the weather conditions were dubious. He therefore decided not to attempt a climb. At around 06:30 local time, Gauntlett and Atkinson had fallen from the ice. The cause and circumstances of the accident are still unknown. Both were aged 21.

On 21 March 2009, a memorial service was held in Christ's Hospital Chapel to commemorate the lives of the two climbers.
