= True Justice (South Korean TV series) =

2014–2015 South Korean TV series

- Logo
- Hangul: 정의본색
- Hanja: 正義本色
- RR: Jeonguibonsaek
- MR: Chŏngŭibonsaek
- Genre: Variety; Reality
- Starring: Kim Gu-ra; Niel; Sam Hammington; Sam Ochiri; Kim Bo-sung; Kang Chul-woong; Yoon Hyung-bin
- Country of origin: South Korea
- Original language: Korean

Original release
- Network: MBC
- Release: December 18, 2014 – January 8, 2015

True Justice (Korean: 정의본색), also known as Define True Colors, is a South Korean variety show that aired on MBC from December 18, 2014 to January 8, 2015. The show was also broadcast through MBC Plus Media's four channels: MBC Every1, MBC Music, MBC Dramanet, and MBC Queen.

The show aimed to discuss the problems of the nation with a live audience who shared their views and opinions. By interacting with the audience, the cast tried to resolve the issues that the audience had expressed.

== Cast ==
- Kim Gu-ra (김현동) - the oldest member of the show's cast, he often acted as the mediator to the discussions.
- Niel (니엘) - the youngest member of the cast, Niel was a hard worker and advocated for justice.
- Sam Hammington (샘 해밍턴)
- Sam Okyere (샘 오취리)
- Kim Bo-sung (김보성) - described as 'curious' and 'competitive' in his viewpoints.
- Kang Chul-woong (강철웅)
- Yoon Hyung-bin (윤형빈)

== List of episodes ==
Episode	Air Date	Summary
1	December 18, 2014	In a life-size cigarette costume, Kang Chul-woong catches the attention of many citizens in the big city, forcing them to stop and think about the effects of smoking.
2	December 25, 2014	The cast turns their attention to garbage that is littered on streets everywhere. The team challenge views and perceptions about littering, before splitting off into two teams in a bid to see which team can collect the most garbage up off of the streets.
3	January 1, 2015	The cast continues to challenge views and perceptions about littering, taking their campaign to the city.
4	January 8, 2015	In the final episode, the cast discuss a variety of issues, from fires to shoe shining.
