= Sam Hammington =

Australian actor (born 1977)

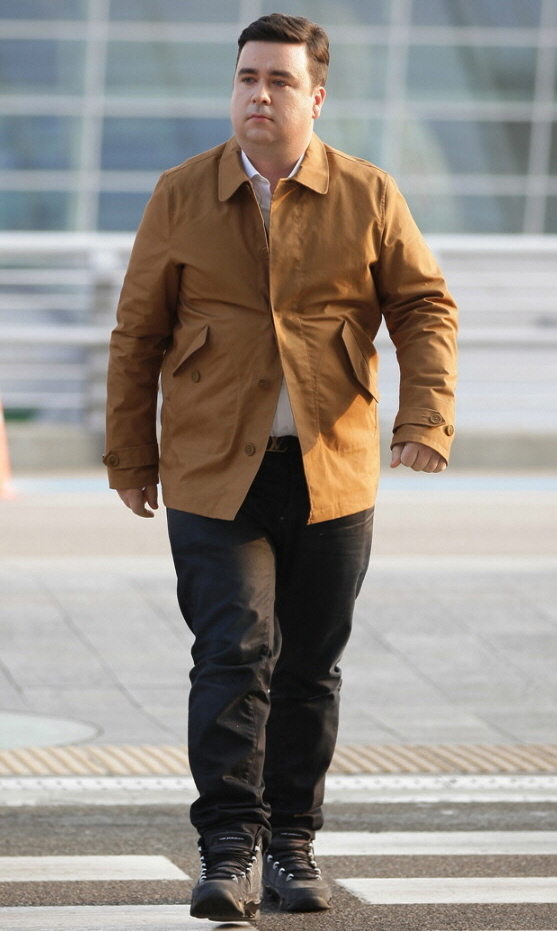
- Hammington in 2015
- Born: Samuel Mayer Russ Hammington; 31 July 1977 (age 49); Wellington, New Zealand
- Spouse: Jung Yu-mi (m. 2013)
- Children: 2
- Parent: Jan Russ (mother)

Comedy career
- Years active: 1977–present

Samuel Mayer Russ Hammington (born 31 July 1977) is a New Zealand-born Australian comedian who is primarily active in South Korea. Hammington hosted radio show Drivetime with Annabelle Ambrose from 2008 to 2012. He was a cast member of popular reality-military show Real Men. He was also cast as a member of the popular KBS reality-variety show The Return of Superman with his two sons, William and Bentley Hammington.

== Early life ==
Hammington was born on 31 July 1977 in Wellington, New Zealand, to Bruce William Hammington and casting director, Jan Russ.

While studying a business degree in university, he decided he needed to take up Asian-language courses to help build up his resume. Due to the popularity of Japanese- and Chinese-language courses, he decided to study Korean. He studied Korean for 18 months before becoming a transfer student at Korea University in 2002.

== Personal life ==
In October 2013, Hammington married Jeong Yu-mi, a Korean. They had two wedding ceremonies: a traditional Korean one in Korea and another in his home country, Australia, at Melbourne Zoo. They have two sons, William (정태오; Jeong Tae-oh) Hammington (born 12 July 2016) and Bentley (정우성; Jeong Woo-seong) Hammington (born 8 November 2017).

== Filmography ==
=== TV shows ===
Year	Title	Network	Role	Notes	Ref.
1981	Holiday Island	Network Ten	Andrew Alston	"The Best of Everything" (Season 1, Episode 12)	
1983	All the Rivers Run	Seven Network / HBO	Gordon Edwards		
1983	The Flying Doctors	Nine Network	Richard Connors	"A Rural Education" (Season 7, Episode 5)	
1985	Neighbours	Seven Network	Michael Martin	2 episodes	
2004	The Woman Who Wants to Marry	MBC	Italian Chef	Ep. 15	
2008	Ophojol		Hamel	"Hamel Pyoryugi" (Episode 17)	
2014	Let's Eat	tvN	President of Soy Sauce Crab Restaurant	Ep. 12	
2014	Flower Grandpa Investigation Unit	tvN	Russian robber	Ep. 1	
2014	Adventures of Ceratops	MBC	Presenter	Documentary	
2015	Persevere, Goo Hae Ra	Mnet	Himself	Ep. 3	
2015	Who Are You: School 2015	KBS2	New English Teacher	Cameo (Ep. 15)	
2016	Dramaworld	Viki	Himself		
2017	Teacher Oh Soon-Nam	MBC	Teacher Cha		
2020	Zombie Detective	KBS2	Butcher	Cameo w/ son William (Ep. 5)	
2021	Revolutionary Sisters	KBS2	Himself	Cameo w/ sons William and Bentley (Ep. 27)	

=== Film ===
Year	Title	Role	Notes	Ref.
2002	Fun Movie	Soldier in Boat	Voice	
2005	Antarctic Journal	English Explorer	Voice	
2014	How to Steal a Dog	English Teacher		
2015	Granny's Got Talent	English Teacher		

=== Variety show ===
Year	Title	Role	Notes	Ref.
2013	Witch Hunt	Host	Ep. 1–33	
2013–2015	Real Men	Member	Season 1	
2014	True Justice	Host		
2014	Always Cantare	Regular Member		
2015	My Neighbor, Charles	Teacher	S1 Ep. 8	
2015	Law of the Jungle	Tribe Member	Ep. 150–152	
2015	Law of the Jungle	Tribe Member	Ep. 171–177	
2015	Law of the Jungle	Tribe Member	Ep. 191–194	
2016	Battle Trip	Contestant	Ep. 22 (with Sam Okyere)	
2016–2022	The Return of Superman	Cast	Ep. 154 – 413 (w/ his children William and Bentley)	
2018	Creaking Heroes	Member	Ep. 1–2	
2020	Friendly Variety Show	Cast		
2020	National Trot Festival	Judge		
2022	Choice of 7 Billion	Rotating Panelist	Regular Member	
2022	The Hammington's Dream Closet	Cast	w/ sons William and Bentley	
2022	The King of Ssireum	Contestant		
2023	One Meal After Work	Host		

== Awards and nominations ==
Year	Award ceremony	Category	Nominee / work	Result	Ref.
2013	MBC Entertainment Awards	Best Male Newcomer/Rookie Award in Show/Variety	Real Men	Won	
2014	MBC Entertainment Awards	Friendship Award	Real Men	Won	
2018	16th KBS Entertainment Awards	Top Excellence Award – Male Variety Category	The Return of Superman	Won	
2019	17th KBS Entertainment Awards	Top Excellence Award – Entertainment Category	The Return of Superman	Nominated	
2019	17th KBS Entertainment Awards	Grand Prize (Daesang) w/ other Superman fathers	The Return of Superman	Won	
2020	18th KBS Entertainment Awards	Grand Prize (Daesang)	The Return of Superman	Nominated	
