= Christian Burgos =

Television personality (b. 1993)

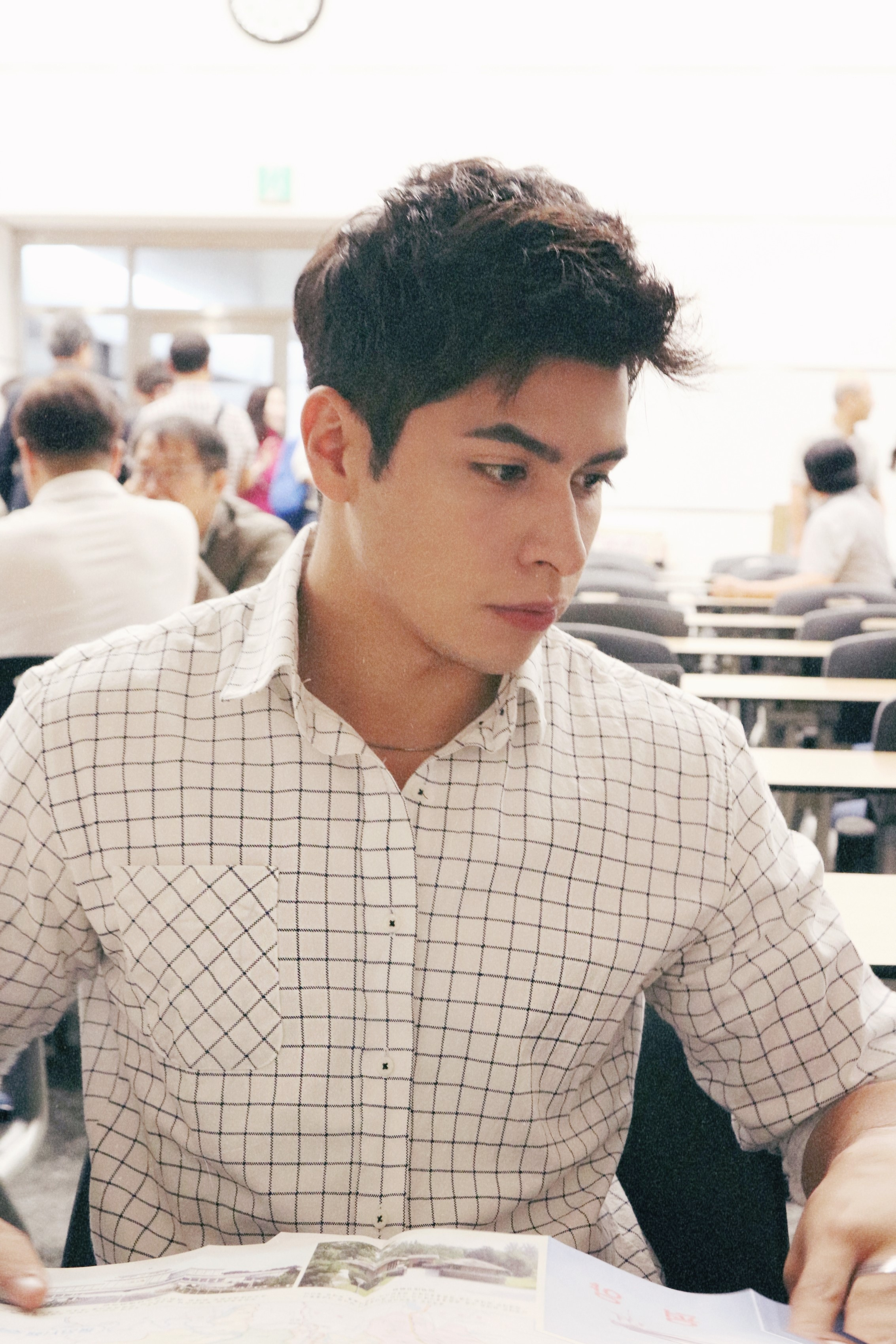
- Born: Christian Shamed Burgos Atala; August 24, 1993 (age 32); Mexico City, Mexico
- Occupation: Television personality
- Years active: 2016–present

Christian Shamed Burgos Atala (born August 24, 1993) is a Mexican television personality living and performing in South Korea. He rose to prominence in 2016 as a cast member of the variety talk show Non-Summit. He is also known for his recurring appearance on Welcome, First Time in Korea? and Where Is My Friend's Home.

In 2018, he was awarded a merit plaque by the Mexican Embassy in Korea in appreciation of his efforts to promote Mexico to the Korean public.

== Filmography ==
=== Variety show ===
| Year | Title | Notes |
|---|---|---|
| 2016–2017 | Non-Summit | Guest on episode 68, recurring from episode 105 |
| 2017–present | Welcome, First Time in Korea? | Recurring cast member |
| 2018 | Where Is My Friend's Home | Cast member |
| 2018 | King of Mask Singer | Contestant (Mussel) Episode 173 |
| 2018–2019 | Miss Trot | Judge |
| 2019 | A Man Who Feeds The Dog (Season 4) | Cast member |
| 2019–2022 | South Korean Foreigners | Recurring cast member |

=== Television series ===
| Year | Title | Role | Notes |
|---|---|---|---|
| 2019 | Mon Chou Chou Global House | Nicky | Main role |

== Awards ==
- 2018 Embassy of Mexico in Korea - Achievement plaque
