= Armin Mujakic =

Austrian footballer

Personal information
- Full name: Armin Mujakic
- Date of birth: 7 March 1995 (age 31)
- Place of birth: Vienna, Austria
- Height: 1.89 m (6 ft 2 in)
- Positions: Attacking midfielder; striker

Team information
- Current team: FCM Traiskirchen
- Number: 10

Youth career
- Rapid Wien

Senior career*
Years	Team	Apps	(Gls)
2012–2018	Rapid Wien II	73	(22)
2015–2018	Rapid Wien	5	(0)
2018–2019	Atromitos	17	(1)
2019–2020	Lommel	4	(0)
2020	Chungnam Asan FC	17	(4)
2021-	FCM Traiskirchen	0	(0)

International career^{‡}
2010	Austria U16	1	(0)
2015	Austria U20	1	(0)
- * Club domestic league appearances and goals as of 11 July 2020 ‡ National team caps and goals as of October 2, 2018

Armin Mujakic (born 7 March 1995) is an Austrian football player who plays as an attacking midfielder or a striker for FCM Traiskirchen.

A product of Rapid Wien's academy, he debuted with the first team at 20 and stayed with the club for a total of six years, from 2012 to 2018.

Following brief spells in Greece, Belgium and South Korea (in this last case, he became the first foreign player signed by Chungnam Asan FC since its foundation), in 2021 he returned to Austria to play with FCM Traiskirchen, which was competing in the local third-tier.
