= Carlos Gorito =

Brazilian television personality in South Korea

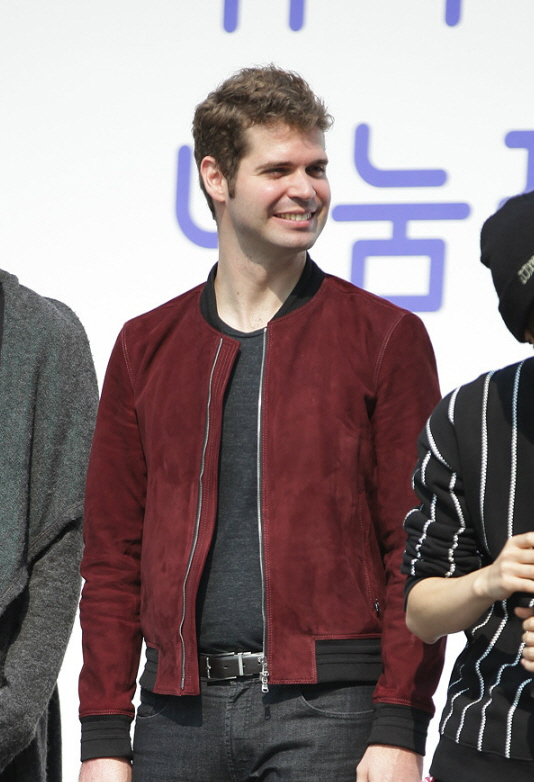
- Gorito in 2015
- Born: May 17, 1986 (age 40); Resende, Rio de Janeiro, Brazil
- Occupations: Television personality, embassy worker
- Spouse: Ku Hye-won (m. 2021)
- Website: Carlos Gorito on Instagram

Carlos Augusto Cardoso Gorito (born May 17, 1986) is a Brazilian who lives and performs in South Korea as a television personality and embassy worker. He is currently a cast member in the talk show Non-Summit. In 2015, he wrote a column for the JoongAng Ilbo newspaper on topics like association football, Korean Wave and traditional festivals.

== Filmography ==
=== Television series ===
| Year | Title | Role | Notes |
|---|---|---|---|
| 2014 | Kang Yong-suk's Gosohan 19 | Himself | |
| 2015–present | Non-Summit | Himself | cast member |
| 2015 | Battle of Tongues | Himself | |

=== Film ===
| Year | Title | Role | Notes |
|---|---|---|---|
| 2009 | Take Off | Bodyguard | |
