= Przemysław Krompiec =

Polish male model (born 1985)

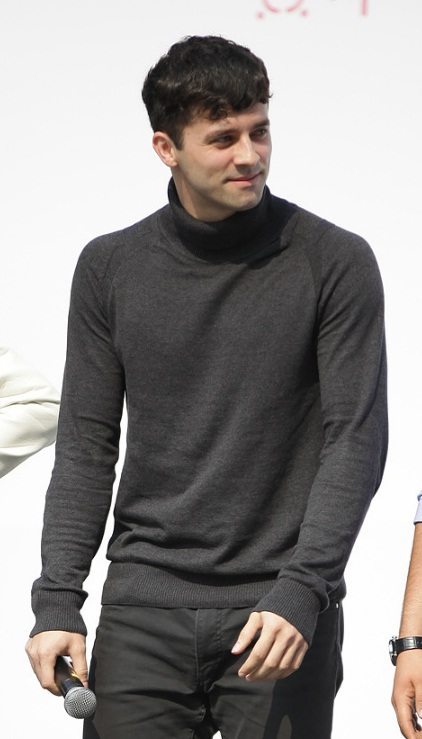
- Krompiec in 2015
- Born: 3 March 1985 (age 40); Wysoka, Opole Voivodeship, Poland
- Occupation(s): Television personality, Model
- Website: Youtube, Instagram

Przemysław Kazimierz Gabriel Krompiec (born 3 March 1985) is a Polish male model who performs in South Korea as a television personality and dancer. He is a graduate student of the Chung-Ang University.

== Personal life ==
=== Education and work in South Korea ===
In 2004, he studied at the Opole University of Technology, and graduated from the university in 2008. He studied Korean at the Seoul National University Korean Language Education Center. In 2009, he began pursuing his master's degree in Design at University of Ulsan. After graduating, he studied at the Graduate School of Advanced Imaging Science, Multimedia & Film Chung-Ang University. He arrived in South Korea for the first time in 2006. He was accepted to the NIE Program of Polish Government in 2008 and moved to Korea for his studies.

== Career ==
In the summer of 2015 he first appeared on the television program Non-Summit as the Polish representative. On August 5, 2015, National Museum of Korea appointed him as an goodwill ambassador for Polish art exhibition.

== Filmography ==
=== Television series ===
| Year | Title | Network | Role | Notes |
|---|---|---|---|---|
| 2015 | Non-Summit | JTBC | Himself | cast member |
