= Ilya Belyakov =

Russian South Korean entertainer (born 1982)

- Born: 26 August 1982 (age 44); Vladivostok
- Citizenship: South Korean
- Occupations: Television personality, Medical interpreter

Ilya Belyakov (Russian: Илья Беляков, Korean: 일리야 벨랴코프, born 26 August 1982) is a South Korean of Russian origin who lives and performs in South Korea as a television personality, medical interpreter, professional linguist and language teacher.

== Personal ==
=== Early life ===
He was born in Vladivostok, a port city of the Russian Far East, an approximate two-hour flight from Seoul, where he majored in Korean language at Far Eastern Federal University.

=== Education and work in South Korea ===
He arrived in South Korea for the first time in 2003, and received the highest score, for a Russian, on the language proficiency test TOPIK. He completed a master's degree at the Yonsei University Korean Language Institute as a scholarship student supported by the Korea Foundation, and in 2015 was studying for a Ph.D in anthropology and linguistics at the University of South Carolina. He is fluent in Japanese, English, French and Spanish, as well as Korean.

He started working at Samsung's global human resources department in 2010.

He is a contributing columnist for Korea.net, sharing anecdotal and cultural perspectives as a Russian living in Seoul.

== Broadcast and acting career ==
On 17 November 2014 he was a "visiting intern" guest on the JTBC talk-variety show Non-Summit, that was made of a cast of young men from different countries, living in Seoul, who debated and discussed issues, in Korean, with perspectives they brought from their various cultures, from their native countries. He was selected to become a permanent cast member on 12 January 2015 for Episode 28. As part of the cast, along with more serious discussions, he shared his old-fashioned dress style of bell-bottoms, entertained with a song duet with Baek Jiyoung, and told stories of growing up in Russia. When Non-Summit changed six members of the cast on 29 June 2015, after Episode 52, in order to add new cast from different countries, he was recognized, by his fans and the show's audience, as a special contributing member to the show's reception.

=== Celebrity and endorsements ===
In April 2015, he and Non-Summit cast member Tyler Rasch, both Honorary Culture Sharing Ambassadors of the Korea Foundation, attended a ceremony for the new "Koreans and Foreigners Together" program.

== Filmography ==
=== Television series ===
Year	Title	Network	Role	Notes
2014-2015	Non-Summit	JTBC	Himself	cast member
2015	Ssulzun	JTBC	Himself	guest
2017	Running Man	SBS	Himself	brief appearance (ep. 351)
