= Sam Okyere =

Television personality

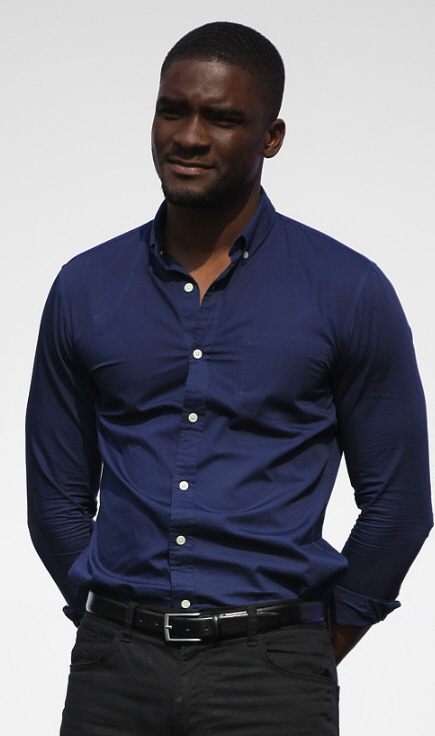
- Okyere in 2015
- Born: Accra, Ghana
- Occupation: Television personality
- Website: Sam Okyere on Instagram

Samuel Nana Kwesi Okyere Jan Tuiniboa Coduia Dalco is a Ghanaian television personality active in South Korea and Ghana.

== Early life ==
He was accepted into the Korean Government Scholarship Program in 2009 and moved to Korea to study computer science and engineering at Sogang University, in Seoul. Okyere is fluent in the Ashanti Twi dialect of the Ghanaian Akan language; Korean, English, French and Swahili.

== Career ==
He was a cast member in the JTBC talk show Non-Summit. He was listed in Forbes 30 Under 30 Asia in 2017.

=== Controversy ===
Sam Okyere took to his Instagram in early August 2020 to condemn the use of Blackface in a graduation photo by a student from a high school in South Korea. His post was quickly met with criticism and caused controversy for his reproaching the use of the derogatory theatrical make-up formally used to caricature and play on the racial stereotypes of black people.

Controversy was raised for his highlighting the issue where he was accused of openly criticising the incident in an ill-natured way, as well as failing to ask for permission to re-post the image on his Instagram. He has since deleted the post and apologised for the post.

Okyere has since spoken after this issue in a BBC News podcast, wishing to highlight and create conversation to better gather understanding in regards to racial social issues. He has previously spoken on the issue of blackface used in the entertainment industry.

New backlash has arisen following a comment made on a photo of himself and actress Park Eun-hye in March 2019 by replying to a comment that was deemed suggestive.

Okyere has deleted his Instagram account due to additional backlash for the comment.

== Filmography ==
=== Variety shows ===
Year	Title	Network	Role	Notes
2013	Island Village Teacher	tvN	Cast	
2014	Running Man	SBS	Guest	Ep. 202-203 (with Fabien)
2014	Golden Tower	tvN	Cast	
2014	True Justice	MBC	Cast	
2014–2016, 2017	Non-Summit	JTBC	Cast	
2015	Real Men Season 2	MBC	Member	
2015	Law of the Jungle in Palau	SBS	Cast	Ep. 146–150
2015	Our Neighborhood Arts and Physical Education	KBS2	Guest	Ep. 91, 102
2015	Infinite Challenge	MBC	Guest	Ep. 453
2016	Infinite Challenge	MBC	Guest	Ep. 465 (with Jack Black & Sam Hammington)
2016	Infinite Challenge	MBC	Guest	Ep. 484–486
2016	Battle Trip	KBS2	Contestant	Ep. 22 (with Sam Hammington)
2017	I Can See Your Voice 4	Mnet	Cast	Ep. 8
2017	My Little Television	MBC	Guest	Ep. 84-85 (with Tyler Rasch)
2018	Please Take Care of My Refrigerator	JTBC	Guest	Ep. 168–169 (with Alberto Mondi)
2018	Knowing Bros	JTBC	Guest	Ep. 129 (with So Yoo-jin)
2018	Dunia: Into a New World	MBC	Cast	
2019	Friendly Variety Show	MBN	Cast	
2020	Love of 7.7 Billion	JTBC	Guest	Ep. 7

=== TV series ===
Year	Title	Role	Notes
2015	Warm and Cozy	Sam	cameo, Ep. 5–7
2016	Moorim School: Saga of the Brave	Sam	

=== Film ===
Year	Title	Role	Notes
2015	Intimate Enemies	Yakubu	

== Awards and nominations ==
Year	Award	Category	Nominated work	Result
2015	8th Korea Drama Awards	Global Star Award	Warm and Cozy	Won
2019	14th Asia Model Awards	Fashionista Award	—N/a	Won
