= James Hooper (climber) =

British mountain climber and adventurer (born 1987)

James N. Hooper
- Born: 1987 (age 38–39); Portsmouth, England
- Education: Kyung Hee University; University of Wollongong
- Occupations: Mountaineer; adventurer; motivational speaker; academic
- Employer: Dongguk University
- Known for: Climbing Mount Everest at age 19; 180° Pole-to-Pole expedition
- Awards: National Geographic Adventurers of the Year (2008)

James N. Hooper (born 1987) is a British mountain climber and adventurer who in 2006 became one of the youngest Britons to climb Mount Everest, along with his friend Rob Gauntlett.

== Biography ==
Hooper was born in Portsmouth and raised in Cardiff, Wales by a single father who worked as a civil engineer. He attended Christ's Hospital, a boarding school in West Sussex, on a scholarship, where he befriended his classmate Rob Gauntlett at the age of 11.

Hooper and Gauntlett frequently discussed their dream of climbing Mount Everest, which was sparked in 2003 when they were 16. They prepared by climbing Mont Blanc in 2005 and a selection of other peaks, guided by their school's climbing instructor, and cycling through Europe. They struggled to raise the funds to cover the costs of a professional guided expedition, and only secured their last sponsor on the day before they departed. In May 2006 they travelled to Tibet and climbed Everest from the north side, becoming the youngest Britons to reach the summit, both aged 19.

In 2007, Hooper and Gauntlett began their next expedition, "180° Pole-to-Pole": the first trip from the North Magnetic Pole to the South Magnetic Pole (a journey of 26,000 miles (42,000 km)) using only human and natural power, in order to raise awareness of climate change. Starting north of Greenland in April 2007, they skied, sledded, cycled and sailed until they reached the Antarctic in April 2008, after 409 days. They were subsequently awarded the National Geographic Adventurers of the Year prize for 2008.

Hooper, Gauntlett, and two other school friends, Richard Lebon and James Atkinson, travelled to Chamonix in January 2009 to attempt a winter ascent of Mont Blanc. While Hooper and Lebon ended up forgoing their effort, Gauntlett and Atkinson continued up an ambitious technical route and fell to their deaths from the Gervasutti Couloir.

Following Gauntlett's death, Hooper faced a £90,000 debt from his pole-to-pole expedition. After a book and movie deal were not possible due to the Great Recession, he took up an office job in London. In late 2010, he moved to South Korea to attend Kyung Hee University in Seoul. Continuing regular work as a motivational speaker in South Korea, and now fluent in Korean, he was a cast member in the talk show Non-Summit for short time in 2014 until moving to Australia to complete his doctorate at the University of Wollongong. He has been a Professor in the Department of Biological and Environmental Science at Dongguk University, Korea since May 2020. (Ilya Belyakov's English 82 Questions with James Hooper on YouTube)
