= Leo Ranta =

Finnish YouTuber (born 1994)

- Born: 1994 (age 31–32)
- Occupations: YouTuber, entertainer, model

YouTube information
- Channel: @leoraino
- Years active: 2011–present
- Genres: Travel, lifestyle
- Subscribers: 720 thousand
- Views: 191 million
- Last updated: December 2024

Leo Raino Ranta (born 1994) is a Finnish YouTuber and entertainer based in South Korea. He operates the Korean-language YouTube channel LEOTV (Korean: 레오티비).

== Biography ==
He moved to South Korea as an infant, and is primarily a Korean speaker; he is less proficient at speaking Finnish. His father, Heikki Ranta, is a businessman that initially moved to South Korea to sell equipment for detecting tunnels beneath the Korean Demilitarized Zone. The elder Ranta later switched careers around the time of the 1997 Asian financial crisis. Leo Ranta briefly attended school in Finland in order to improve his Finnish skills, and served in the Finnish military. He graduated from Yonsei University, with a degree in computer science.

He first started his YouTube channel in 2011. By 2024, he had over 250,000 subscribers. He has appeared on various television programs in South Korea. He has worked as a model.
