= Tyler Rasch =

American graduate student (born 1988)

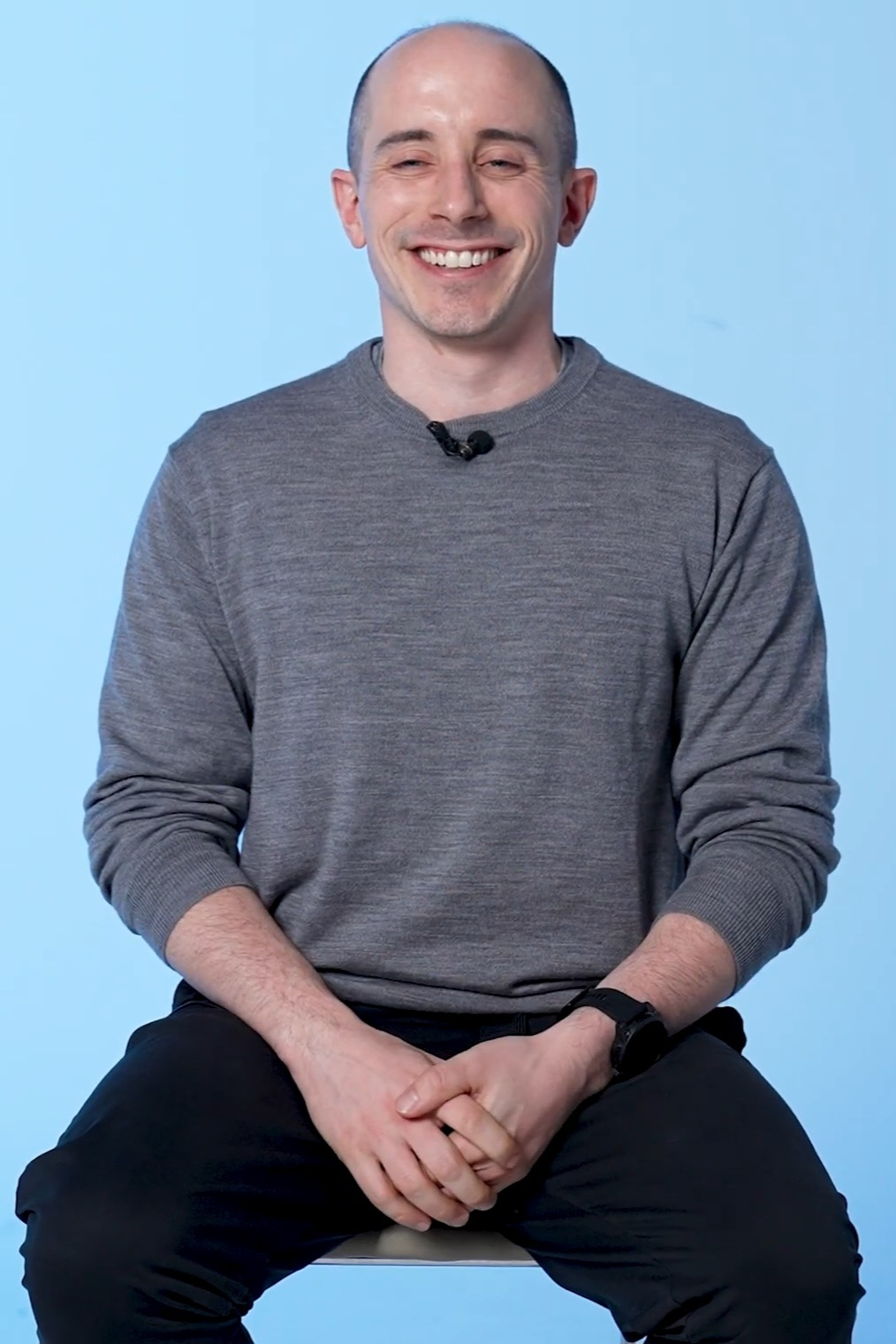
- Tyler Rasch appeared in a YouTube shorts video for the fast speech challenge to promote a Korean speaking contest for foreigners hosted by the Korea Times in 2024
- Born: May 6, 1988 (age 38)
- Education: University of Chicago (BA); Seoul National University (MA)
- Occupations: Television personality, writer, educator, lecturer

Tyler Josef Rasch (born 6 May 1988) is an American writer, educator, lecturer, actor, and television personality in South Korea. He was the author of bestseller "No Second Earth (두 번째 지구는 없다)" and a cast member of hit TV shows such as JTBC's Non-Summit and tvN's Hot Brain: Problematic Men. among others. He has received various awards and distinctions for his work in media, education, and social and environmental issues.

== Personal ==
=== Early life, education, and work in the U.S. ===
Rasch was born in the northeastern United States in 1988. His mother is American and his father an Austrian immigrant.

He graduated from a college-preparatory high school, The Putney School in Putney, Vermont in 2006. The school sits on a 500-acre working dairy farm, with a student-led "work program" and the belief that "education is something to be actively pursued rather than passively received." He said of the farm there, "It promotes a work ethic in the Putney School which prepares its students for the real world."

As the son of an immigrant and growing up in Vermont near the Canada – US border where both English and French are commonly spoken, he was interested in foreign languages at a young age. He first learned French, then in college, switched to different languages every semester including Spanish, German, Portuguese and Japanese. He has said that languages were a useful tool for learning about foreign cultures, and decided to focus on a language that would be significantly different from English. At one point found a Korean book, and started to learn to write Hangul, which he found easy, but speaking the language itself to be more difficult. He had several aspirations for his future, from wanting to be a paleontologist or a music conductor. When the time came for college applications, Rasch had decided to go into the music field, having recordings and CDs prepared. However, after meeting with a University of Chicago representative who visited his high school, with their vast list of language studies and a variety of other topics, he decided to broaden his interest of studies, feeling that the opportunities offered by the music industry was too limited.

Rasch graduated with a B.A. in International Studies in 2010 from the University of Chicago, while pursuing the goal of becoming a diplomat. While at college, he served in a number of training and intern positions. In 2009, he was a Litigation Intern at the Equal Employment Opportunity Commission, and a Program Assistant, then a Program Coordinator at the US-Asia Institute. In 2010, he was an Intern at the United States Senate Committee on the Judiciary.

After graduating, he moved to the Washington metropolitan area where he was Special Assistant to the Ambassador of the Embassy of South Korea, Washington, D.C. from June 2010 to July 2011.

=== Korean education ===
In 2008, while still studying at the University of Chicago, in the U.S., he travelled to Seoul for three months to attend the co-ed Korean language studies at Ewha Womans University.

In 2011, Rasch was accepted into the Korean Government Scholarship Program and moved to Seoul. He studied Korean at the Seoul National University Korean Language Education Center, and in 2012, began pursuing his Master's degree in International Relations at Seoul National University (SNU).

Between July 2013 and July 2014, he worked with other foreign SNU students on creating a webzine about Seoul. "Seoulism", as he stated, was "a means to gather foreigners and Koreans altogether so that we could become a community to initiate a forum of conversation."

From February to July 2014, he was an Intern at the private think tank, the Institute for Global Economics (IGE) at the World Trade Center Seoul.

In August 2016, Rasch graduated from Seoul National University with his Master's Degree in Diplomatic Studies.

== Career ==
On July 7, 2014, he began starring in the new JTBC talk-variety show Non-Summit, which has a cast of young men from different countries, living in Seoul, who debate and discuss issues, in Korean, with perspectives they bring from their various cultures, from their native countries. Early promotions noted him as a detailed scholar who read the works of Mencius. He said that Non-Summit supported the government scholarship, including a year of language training, that he and his co-star Ghanaian Sam Okyere were part of, when he started on the show.

Due to the popularity of the show, he made a surprise appearance on "Arguments," another JTBC talk show about current affairs.

In February 2015, he became a recurring member of the cast of the Non-Summit spinoff reality-travel show Where Is My Friend's Home, starring for ten episodes, through April, 2015, for the first two trips to China and to Belgium. In August 2015 he starred in two episodes visiting South Korea's historical Buyeo County. In February 2016, Where Is My Friend's Home announced plans for a United States trip to visit his home in Vermont for a series of episodes.

On February 26, 2015, he became part of the cast of a new tvN talk-variety show, Hot Brain: Problematic Men, with six men "boasting a high IQ and unique way of thinking". The show is also referred to as "brain-sexy man" using a newly coined term that is becoming popular in Korea, and Rasch is called "an American student who speaks very fluent and high-standard Korean".

He writes newspaper columns for JoongAng Ilbo, with topics like "study abroad", and guests on talk shows, including Arirang TV's News Tellers to discuss education, immigration, jobs, and current affairs issues.

According to his presentation on South Korean military TV published on January 16, 2017, he started working at an environmental solution start-up company in South Korea post his Master's degree from Seoul National University in 2016.

=== Celebrity and endorsements ===
He was a model and promoter for major brands such as Krispy Kreme, Ben & Jerry's, Samsung, Puritan's Pure, Microsoft, Subway, Korean made Binggrae yogurt, Yopa, Yoplait yogurt, and the EDM Study Center.

On March 25, 2015, he attended a Korean traditional food tasting event hosted by the KTO and the Ministry of Culture, Sports and Tourism, along with U.S. Ambassador Mark Lippert, on one of the Ambassador's first public appearances after recovering from a knife attack in early March.

In April 2015, he and Non-Summit cast member Ilya Belyakov attended a ceremony for the new "Koreans and Foreigners Together" program as Honorary Culture Sharing Ambassadors of the Korea Foundation.

On January 12, 2016, he and Non-Summit cast members Guillaume Patry, Alberto Mondi and Zhang Yuan, along with Psy and violinist Clara-Jumi Kang, received the Corea Image Communication Institute awards, for their work in bridging cultural understanding between Koreans and non-Koreans.

== Filmography ==
=== Film ===
Year	Title	Role	Notes
2020	Samjin Company English Class	Jerry (English instructor)	Cast member. This film received the 57th Baeksang Arts Award for Best Film in 2021

=== Television series ===
Year	Title	Role	Station	Notes
2014-2018	Non-Summit	Himself	JTBC	cast member
2015-2019	Problematic Men	Himself	tvN	cast member
2015-2016	Where Is My Friend's Home	Himself	JTBC	cast member, Ep. 1 - 10 - China and Belgium trips; Ep. 27 - 28 - South Korea; Ep. 1 (April 8, 2016 – present) - U.S.
2015	K Time Travelers	Himself	KBS	cast member
2016	King of Mask Singer	Contestant	MBC	as "Suspicious Le Chapelier" (episode 89)
2017	My Little Television	Himself	MBC	guest, along with Sam Okyere (ep. 84 - 85)
2018-2020	Korean Foreigners	Himself	MBC	guest on some episodes
2022	Sikjahoedam (식자회담)	Himself	SBS	cast member
2022	Jiguin Deo Haus (지구인더하우스)	Himself	Channel A	cast member
2022	Shinbakhan Beongkeo (신박한 방커)	Himself	TBS	cast member
2022	Talkpawon 25 Hours	Himself	JTBC	cast member

=== Radio ===
Year	Title	Role	Station	Notes
2016-2022	Suji Lee's Song Square (이수지의 가요광장)	Himself	KBS	Guest host for a section called "Say Whatever You Want to Say" (아무말 대환영) about Korean language expressions
2017-2018	Kim Young-chul's Power FM (김영철의 파워FM)	Himself	SBS	Guest host for a section called "Real American English" (진짜 미국식 영어) about American English expressions
