= Daniel Lindemann =

Television personality

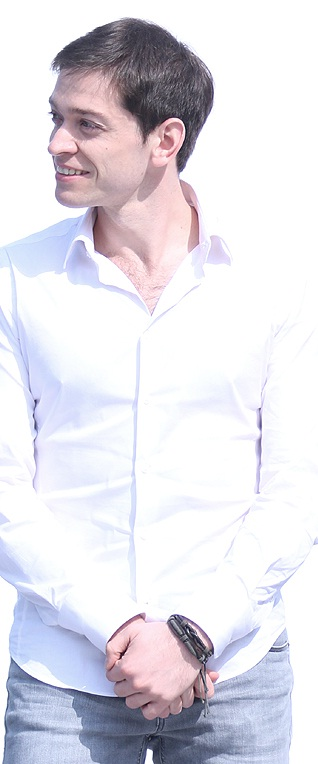
- A German television personality and marketing manager
- Born: 16 October 1985 (age 41); Langenfeld, Rhineland, North Rhine-Westphalia, Germany
- Occupations: Television personality, marketing manager
- Spouse: Unknown (m. 2023)
- Website: Daniel Lindemann on Instagram

Daniel Jakob Lindemann (born 16 October 1985) is a German who lives and performs in South Korea as a television personality and marketing manager. He was a cast member in the talk show Non-Summit.

== Personal life ==
He can play the piano, having been trained from the age of 10 until his teens, and releasing a classical music album with songs composed and played on the piano, called Esperance.

He holds a black belt in both Taekwondo and Hapkido, having trained in Taekwondo since he was 12 when he still lived in his native Germany and earned his black belt there, while the black belt in Hapkido was earned after starting to train Hapkido in a famous Hapkido studio in Seoul, the capital and most populous city in South Korea.

On October 4, 2023, Lindemann announced he would be getting married in December. He married a Korean woman on December 8, 2023.

== Filmography ==
=== Television series ===
Year	Title	Role	Network	Notes
2012	In Depth 21	Himself	SBS	
2014-2016	Non-Summit	Himself	JTBC	cast member
2015	Where Is My Friend's Home	Himself	JTBC	cast member
2016	Moorim School: Saga of the Brave	Daniel	KBS2	drama
2016	Happy Home	German customer	MBC	drama (cameo)
2019	Those Who Cross the Line – Season 2	Himself	MBC	cast member
2019	Flower Crew: Joseon Marriage Agency - Episode 16	German customer	JTBC	

=== Streaming series ===
Acting credit in series
Year	Title	Role	Notes	Ref.
2026	Can This Love Be Translated?	Joo Ho-jin's friend	Special appearance	
