= Alberto Mondi =

Italian entertainer in South Korea (born 1984)

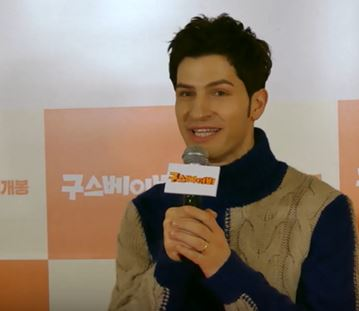
- Mondi in 2019
- Born: 17 January 1984 (age 42); Mirano, Veneto, Italy
- Occupations: Television personality, businessman
- Website: Alberto Mondi on Instagram

Alberto Mondi (born 17 January 1984) is an Italian who lives and performs in South Korea as a television personality and businessman. He is currently a cast member in the talk show Non-Summit. He is a former footballer in Serie D.

== Career ==
=== Beginning in South Korea ===
He attended Kangwon National University and was a teaching assistant there between September 2008 and July 2010. Also in 2008, he was a trainee at the Embassy of Italy in Seoul for four months. From September 2010 – June 2011 he was a research analyst for the Korea Institute of Public Finance. He has been with Fiat Chrysler as a sales area manager since October 2013, and a member of the board of directors of the Italian Chamber of Commerce in Korea since April 2013.

=== Endorsements ===
Between June 2011 and September 2013, he was a Brand Ambassador for SABMiller's Peroni Nastro Azzurro beer. In 2014, he was a model for Mr. Pizza. As a popular TV personality he is photographed on the celebrity scene in Seoul.

=== Columnist ===
In 2015, he wrote a column for the JoongAng Ilbo newspaper on topics like clothing fashion, tourism, and food. He has written articles for the Korea and the World Economy Journal, the Korea Institute of Public Finance publications, and Newsweek Korea.

== Personal life ==
In addition to his native Italian language, he speaks Korean, English and Chinese.

== Filmography ==
=== Film ===
Acting credit in film
Year	Title	Role	Notes	Ref.
2013	The Suspect	foreign reporter	Acting debut, bit part	
2018	The Pub	Alberto	Short film	

=== Series ===
Acting credit in series
Year	Title	Role	Notes	Ref.
2026	Can This Love Be Translated?	Andre	Special appearance as Joo Ho-jin's Italian friend	

=== Television show ===
Television shows appearances
Year	Title	Network	Role	Notes	Ref.
2014–2017	Non-Summit	JTBC	Cast member		
2015–2016	Where Is My Friend's Home	JTBC	Cast member		
2015	Witch Hunt	JTBC	Cast member		
2015	Amazing Recipe	KBS	Co-host	Pilot series	
2015	China is Do-ol	JTBC	Cast member		
2017—2026	Welcome, First Time in Korea?	MBC	Host		
2018	Stray Directors	SBS			
2021	Falling for Korea - Transnational Couples	MBN	Panelist		
2025	Knowing International High School	JTBC	Cast member		

== Radio ==
Year	Title	Station	Role	Notes
2015	Lee Hyun-woo's Music Album	KBS Cool FM	Himself	host, Italian music segment

== Accolades ==
In October 2016, Mondi was awarded the Order of the Star of Italy as recognition for his contributions to both Italian and Korean cultures.
