= MBC every1 =

South Korean cable television network

- Country: South Korea
- Broadcast area: South Korea
- Headquarters: Seoul

Programming
- Language(s): Korean
- Picture format: 1080i HDTV (downscaled to 16:9 480i for the SDTV feed)

Ownership
- Owner: MBC Plus

History
- Launched: 1 January 2003
- Former names: MBC Movies (2003 - 2007)

MBC every1 (Korean: MBC 에브리원) is a South Korean pay television network, specialising in entertainment-related variety programming. It is a subsidiary of MBC Plus.

== History ==
MBC every1 started in October 15, 2007 to air dramas and variety shows and replace the channel MBC MOVIES.

DMB service started from 2008.

== Programs ==
These are MBC every1's currently airing programs:

=== TV series ===
- Please Don't Date Him

=== Variety Show ===
- Weekly Idol
- Idol Show
- Star Show 360
- Video Star
- Showtime

=== Special programming ===
- Melon Music Awards (2010–2017, simulcast on MBC M)
