= Cross Gene =

South Korean boyband

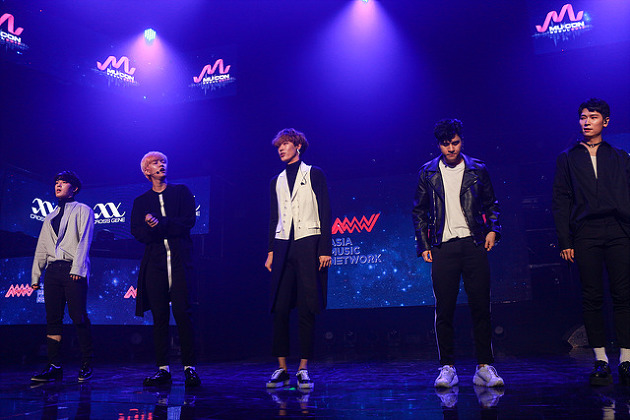
- Cross Gene at MUCON Showcase in September 2017

Background information
- Origin: Seoul, South Korea
- Genres: K-Pop; J-Pop
- Years active: 2012–2021; 2026–present
- Labels: Amuse Korea; Universal Music; Kakao M
- Members: Shin; Yongseok
- Past members: J.G.; Casper; Takuya; Seyoung; Sangmin
- Website: crossgene.co.kr crossgene.jp

Cross Gene (Korean: 크로스진; stylized as CROSS GENE) is a boy band based in South Korea which debuted on June 11, 2012. Signed under Amuse Korea, the group debuted as a six member group but currently consists of only two members: Shin and Yongseok. Shin is the only member still under their label, Amuse Korea. They released their debut mini-album Timeless: Begins in 2012, which peaked at #8 on the Gaon weekly album chart.

== History ==
=== 2012: Formation and Timeless: Begins ===
On May 26, 2012, Amuse Korea revealed that they would be debuting a multinational group consisting of South Korean, Japanese and Chinese singers. Among the members is Shin Won-ho (Shin), an actor who had previously appeared in television dramas and advertisements. Terada Takuya, an Amuse model and actor, was also announced in the lineup and upon Cross Gene's debut became the first fully Japanese K-Pop idol. The entertainment company explained the meaning behind the group's name, stating that the group would "cross the superior genes of each country to create one perfect group". Cross Gene originally consisted of three South Korean members, two Chinese members and one Japanese member.

On June 7, the group held their first showcase at the Ax Korea concert hall. They released their first mini-album Timeless: Begins on June 8. Ten days later, a limited-edition version of the mini-album was released. Timeless: Begins debuted at #9 on the Gaon weekly albums chart, and peaked at #8 the following week.

=== 2013: Member changes, Japanese promotions and With U ===
In January 2013, Amuse Korea announced that Seyoung would be joining Cross Gene as a new member. He replaced J.G., who left Cross Gene to start a career as a solo artist. Following J.G.'s departure, Takuya stepped down as the leader and the position was given to Shin instead.

On February 27, Cross Gene released their Japanese debut single, "Shooting Star". The song was performed for the first time during a promotional event for the Korean drama Big in Japan. Their Japanese single album was released on March 13, followed by the digital single "Crazy" on the May 29. On May 31, Cross Gene held their first Japanese Concert, Cross U, at Shibuya O-East, during which the group spoke about J.G. leaving and the change in leadership.

On August 1, Cross Gene released the digital single "Dirty Pop", followed by a special photobook CD, With U. The photobook was a limited release that was not made available outside of concert venues until late 2014. Cross Gene held two more concerts – With U on 22 August at Shibuya Public Hall and an encore performance on 31 August at Umeda Club Quattro. The Shibuya Public Hall concert would later be released on DVD in the same photobook format as the With U EP.

Cross Gene Planet, the official Japanese fansite, was launched on September 2. During the latter part of the year Cross Gene released three more digital singles in Japan: "My Love Song" in October, "Page of Love" in November and "Aurora" in December. During November, Cross Gene also started activities in China, performing for ATV at the Mr. Asia contest. They also held a fanmeeting and performance at the Dragon Centre in Hong Kong. On November 28, Cross Gene received a Rookie Award at the 21st Korean Culture and Entertainment Awards.

Cross Gene's third Japan live performance, Rock U, was held on December 6 at Umeda Club Quattro and on December 14 and 15 as part of Amuse Musical Theatre. Following the conclusion of Rock U, the group hinted at an upcoming project – Project Z. They also participated in the concert Super Handsome Live 2013 on December 26 and 27 as a supporting act.

=== 2014: Digital singles, ZEDD and other appearances ===
In early 2014, Cross Gene travelled to Los Angeles to film for the movie ZEDD.

On April 6, a visual teaser for the single"Amazing (Bad Lady)" was uploaded onto the official YouTube followed by a music video teaser on the 14th. Their comeback was initially scheduled for April 21 but was delayed out of respect for the victims and families of the Sewol ferry disaster.

On May 29, Cross Gene returned to Hong Kong to perform for ATV's 50th Anniversary special. They also held a second fan meeting and performance at the Dragon Centre in Hong Kong.

The group released the Korean digital single "Amazing (Bad Lady)" on June 9, following a nearly 2-year absence. However, Casper was missing from all related promotions after suffering a hip/lower back injury. On June 26, Cross Gene released a music video for the Korean version of "Shooting Star". On June 28, they held their fourth live Japanese performance Amazing de Show at Differ Ariake Arena in Tokyo. Casper was able to return and perform with them. Another show, Cross Show: ZEDD, was announced for October. During July and August, Cross Gene participated in Japanese music festivals including Amuse BBQ 2014, Summer Sonic in Osaka, and as the opening act for Asia Departure on A-Nation Island. Takuya also joined the Korean television show Non-Summit as the representative for Japan.

On 10 September, Cross Gene released the music video for "Billion Dolla", the theme track for their movie ZEDD, which was released on DVD on September 24. Cross Gene performed Cross Show: Zedd in Tokyo on October 12 and 13 with a total of four shows over two days. During Cross Show: Zedd, they also announced a Japanese comeback scheduled for January 14, 2015 with a new single titled "Future". They also posted a notice on their Korean fancafe the following day for an intended Korean comeback in November 2014. On November 10, Cross Gene released their second digital single "I'm Not a Boy, Not Yet a Man".

Cross Gene's main vocalists, Seyoung and Yongseok, were both cast in separate theatre performances starting from November. Cross Gene also performed at Skechers Sundown Festival in Singapore on November 22 and as part of Super Handsome Live 2014 on December 26, 27 and 28 at Pacifico Yokohama.

=== 2015: Japanese and Korean promotions ===
Shin was scheduled as a regular for FM Yokohama's Aja Aja Friday and Seyoung continued performing for the Korean Stage Musical Bachelor's Vegetable Store for their Japanese performances. Cross Gene's second Japanese single "Future" was released on January 14. It ranked at #4 on the Oricon's Daily Singles chart, peaking at #3 five days later. Future also ranked #5 on the Oricon Weekly singles chart. Aja Aja Friday finished airing at the end of March and Shin moved to his own show Shin-Kun no Yoru no Chuusday to air at 11:30pm every Tuesday night on FM Yokohama.

Cross Gene next returned to Korea with "Play With Me" on April 12, also releasing their third mini album of the same name. Play With Me entered GAON Albums Chart at #7 on the Weekly Chart. "Play With Me" was also nominated for Song of the Week on SBS MTV The Show three times during its promotional run.

Following this, Cross Gene returned to Japan with their third single "Love & Peace", a track that featured on the OST for Dual Master Revolution. The single, released on July 25, was the first single that they had written the lyrics for. The physical release of Love & Peace was postponed briefly and it was announced that it would be released as a double-A side single with the track "Shi-Tai!" as well as a previously announced track, "Miracle", on October 7. "Miracle" was the second song released that was written by the Cross Gene members. Love & Peace/Shi-Tai! debuted on Oricon Daily Singles chart at 2nd, peaking at #1. It placed at #2 on the weekly chart and at #74 on Oricon Yearly Singles Chart.

Cross Gene held their first concert in Korea, Be Happy Together Live (Xmas Eve Eve Night) on December 23. The tickets for the concert sold out within the first minute. This was the first of two concerts, the second to be held in Japan in the new year.

=== 2016–2017: Game, Ying Yang and Mirror ===
On January 21, 2016, Cross Gene released their third mini album Game, along with a music video for the title track "Noona, You".

In June 2016, Cross Gene released their first full-length Japanese album, Ying Yang. The album consisted of 14 tracks including the title track "Ying Yang", a song for the fans, "Tegami" ("letter" in Japanese), and five other previously unreleased songs: "Keep on Dancing", "Love Game", "Sobani Ite", "Dreamer" and "No No No". Shin was also scheduled to play Tae Oh in the Korean drama Legend of the Blue Sea, starring alongside Lee Min-ho and Jun Ji-hyun. The drama aired its first episode on November 16, 2016, and its last episode on January 25, 2017.

Cross Gene's fourth mini album Mirror was released on February 8 with a title track called "Black or White".

On August 31 it was revealed that Chinese member Casper had left the group. Their company announced that it had no plans of adding new members and that they'd stay as a 5-member group.

Shortly after, on September 8, it was announced that members Seyoung, Sangmin and Yongseok would be members of a new sub-unit, X HEARTS (크로스하츠). They held 4 mini-lives, titled U&I=ONE, in 3 different cities: Jeonju (September 16), Busan (September 17), and two more on September 24 in Seoul. Member Shin also is scheduled to appear in upcoming drama 20th Century Boy and Girl as Han Ye-seul's younger brother, Sa Min-ho. Its first episode was scheduled to air on October 2, but got postponed. The first 4 episodes aired on Monday, October 9.

=== 2018-2021: Zero, more individual activities ===
In February 2018, member Yongseok participated in the Japanese musical My Bucket List as Kanggu, together with Taewoong (Snuper), Injun (DGNA) and musical actors Minsu and Kim Namho. In the same month it was also announced that CROSS GENE would have a concert in Japan titled Utopia, on April 30.

On April 23, the first teaser for CROSS GENE's long awaited Korean comeback dropped. Their 5th Korean mini-album titled Zero would be released on May 8. Zero has 4 tracks, 2 of which are the title tracks. Along with the songs are 2 official M/Vs (Touch It, Fly), 1 short video (Dystopia) and 1 self-directed M/V by the members (Believe Me). One of the songs on the album, Dystopia, was pre-released on April 30. At the showcase for Zero, Shin revealed that he was going to play a role in upcoming K-drama Risky Romance. In it, he plays Choi Jae-seung.

Takuya was set to play Abraham again in the Japanese version of the musical Altar Boyz. He played the same role in the 2017 version of it, too. Yongseok would play in another Japanese musical as well, titled Voice. In August, Yongseok played in My Bucket List again, though this time the opposing side of his first role, Haegi. The other leads in this musical were Karam (DGNA), Sunwoo (Boys Republic) and again, musical actor Kim Namho. Seyoung is set to play Puck in the Japanese musical Shakespeare's A Midsummer Night's Dream, from September 14 until September 17.

On December 10, it was revealed that Takuya left the group to pursue acting and modelling.

On December 30, 2019 it was announced that members Sangmin and Yongseok have decided not to renew their contracts. Group activities are temporarily suspended too due to enlistment but they will discuss the group's future upon discharge.

On March 24, 2020, Sangmin officially enter the military and will be discharge on September 29, 2021.

On November 17, 2020, Yongseok officially enter the military and will be discharge on May 16, 2022.

On November 18, 2020, Shin share a letter for the fans that he made his military enlistment last October 19, 2020 as a public service. The report was delayed due to Shin's will to enter quietly. He will be discharge on July 18, 2022.

On December 9, 2020, member Seyoung announced his departure from Cross Gene. Seyoung open a YouTube channel "Coiblen" for his vlogs and cover songs videos.

=== 2026: Reunion with Shin and Yongseok ===
On February 21, 2026, members Shin and Yongseok announced they would be resuming activities as a duo starting with their first schedule being Shin's 15th anniversary concert on March 27.

== Members ==
=== Current ===
- Shin (신)
- Yongseok (용석)

=== Former ===
- Casper (캐스퍼)
- J.G (제이지)
- Takuya (타쿠야)
- Seyoung (세영)
- Sangmin (상민)

== Discography ==
=== Studio albums ===
Title	Album details	Peak chart positions	Sales
Title	Album details	JPN	Sales
Japanese
Ying Yang	Released: June 29, 2016; Label: Universal Japan; Format: CD, DVD, digital download	12	JPN: 6,796
"—" denotes releases that did not chart or were not released in that region.

=== Extended plays ===
Title	Album details	Peak chart positions		Sales
Title	Album details	KOR	JPN	Sales
Korean
Timeless: Begins	Released: June 11, 2012; Label: Amuse Korea, Universal Korea; Formats: CD, digital download; Track list: 1. One Way Love; 2. Sky High; 3. For This Love; 4. La-Di Da-Di; 5. My Lady; 6. La-Di Da-Di (Inst.)	8	187	KOR: 5,940+
Play With Me	Released: April 13, 2015; Label: Amuse Korea, Universal Korea; Formats: CD, digital download; Track list: 1. Amazing (Bad Lady); 2. Watch Out; 3. My Love Song; 4. Play with Me (나하고 놀자); 5. I'm Not a Boy, Not Yet a Man (어려도 남자야); 6. Holiday	7	65	KOR: 4,819+
Game	Released: January 21, 2016; Label: Amuse Korea, Universal Korea; Formats: CD, digital download; Track list: 1. Noona, You (누나 너 말야); 2. My Face; 3. Kki (끼); 4. I'll Be Fine; 5. Mr. Secret; 6. Noona, You (누나 너 말야) [Inst.]	13	—	KOR: 5,728
Mirror	Released: February 8, 2017; Label: Amuse Korea, LOEN Entertainment; Formats: CD, digital download; Track list: 1. Black or White (검은색 또는 흰색); 2. Black Mind (검은 마음); 3. White Mind (하얀 마음); 4. Love Guide (연애지침서); 5. Black or White (검은색 또는 흰색) [Inst.]; 6. Love Guide (연애지침서) [Inst.]	2	120	KOR: 12,909
Zero	Released: May 8, 2018; Label: Amuse Korea, LOEN Entertainment; Formats: CD, digital download; Track list: 1. Dystopia; 2. Touch It (달랑말랑); 3. Believe Me; 4. Fly (비상); 5. Touch It (달랑말랑) [Inst.]; 6. Fly (비상) [Inst.]	5	—	KOR: 18,319
Japanese
Timeless: Future	Released: November 21, 2012; Label: Amuse, Inc., Universal Japan; Formats: CD, digital download; Track list: 1. La-Di Da-Di (Japanese ver.); 2. Sky High (Japanese ver.); 3. One Way Love (Japanese ver.); 4. For This Love (Japanese ver.); 5. New Days; 6. La-Di Da-Di (Inst.); 7. New Days (Inst.)	—	203	
With U	Released: August 22, 2013; Label: Amuse, Inc., Universal Japan; Formats: CD; Track list: 1. Crazy (Japanese ver.); 2. Crazy (English ver.); 3. Dirty Pop (Japanese ver.); 4. Dirty Pop (Korean ver.); 5. Page of LovE (Korean ver.); 6. Crazy (Inst.); 7. Dirty Pop (Inst.); 8. Page of LovE (Inst.)	—	—	
"—" denotes releases that did not chart or were not released in that region.

=== Singles ===
Title	Year	Peak chart positions		Sales	Album
Title	Year	KOR	JPN	Sales	Album
Korean
"La-Di Da-Di"	2012	120	—	—N/a	Timeless: Begins
"Sky High"	2012	139	—	—N/a	Timeless: Begins
"Amazing (Bad Lady)"	2014	—	—	—N/a	Play With Me
"I'm Not a Boy, Not Yet a Man"	2014	—	—	—N/a	Play With Me
"Play With Me"	2015	—	—	—	Play With Me
"Hey You, Noonah"	2016	—	—	—	Game
"Black Or White"	2017	—	—	—	Mirror
"Touch It"	2018	—	—	—	Zero
"Helicopter"	2026	—	—	—	Non-album single
Japanese
"Shooting Star"	2013	—	19	—N/a	Ying Yang
"Crazy"	2013	—	—	—N/a	Ying Yang
"Dirty Pop"	2013	—	—	—N/a	Non-album singles
"My Love Song"	2013	—	—	—N/a	Non-album singles
"Page of Love"	2013	—	—	—N/a	Non-album singles
"Aurora"	2013	—	—	—N/a	Ying Yang
"Future"	2015	—	5	JPN: 14,425+	Ying Yang
"Love & Peace/Shi-tai!"	2015	—	2	JPN: 86,128+	Ying Yang
"CORVUS"	2019	—	—	—	Non-album singles
"—" denotes releases that did not chart or were not released in that region.

=== DVDs ===
Title	Album details	Peak chart positions
Title	Album details	JPN
With U Japan Live	Released: December 16, 2013; Label: Amuse, Inc., Universal Japan; Formats: DVD	—

== Music videos ==
Year	Music video	Length	Album
2012	"La-Di Da-Di"	3:15	Timeless: Begins
2012	"Sky High"	3:14	Timeless: Begins
2012	"For This Love"	2:50	Timeless: Begins
2012	"La-Di Da-Di" (Japanese version)	3:15	Timeless: Future
2012	"For This Love" (Japanese version)	3:13	Timeless: Future
2013	"Shooting Star"	4:37	Ying Yang
2014	"Amazing (Bad Lady)"	2:45	Play With Me
2014	"Shooting Star" (Korean version)	4:37	Shooting Star (single)
2014	"Billion Dolla"	6:29	Future (single)
2014	"I'm Not a Boy, Not Yet a Man"	3:50	Nahago Nolja
2014	"Future"	4:11	Ying Yang
2015	"Play With Me"	4:00	Play With Me
2015	"Play With Me" (dance version)	3:31	Play With Me
2015	"Play With Me" (lip sync version)	3:31	Play With Me
2015	"Love & Peace"	4:36	Ying Yang
2015	"Shi-tai!"	3:24	Ying Yang
2016	"Noona, You"	3:29	Game
2016	"Ying Yang"	N/A	Ying Yang
2017	"Black or White" (Drama Version)	5:56	Mirror
2017	"Black or White" (Dance Version)	4:14	Mirror
2017	"Love Guide"	3:06	Mirror
2018	"Touch It"	4:28	Zero
2018	"Touch It" (Dance Version A)	3:36	Zero
2018	"Touch It" (Dance Version B)	3:36	Zero
2018	"Fly"	3:18	Zero
2018	"Fly" (Dance Version)	3:18	Zero
2018	"Believe Me"	4:41	Zero

== Filmography ==
Note: For individual members' filmographies, see their articles.

Year	Title	Channel	Notes
2012	Cross BattLE	HTB	Reality TV show
2014	ZEDD	-	Film- Shin as Nine, Seyoung as Zero, Casper as Six Hundred, Yongseok as Seven, Sangmin as Thirteen and Takuya as Xi
2018	会いtime!～ CROSS GENEシアター (Ai Time!～ CROSS GENE Theater)	BS NTV	Reality TV show

== Concerts ==
- Cross Gene 1st Concert In Japan "Cross U" (2013)
- Cross Gene 2nd Concert In Japan "With U" (2013)
- Cross Gene Live In Japan "Rock U" (2013)
- Cross Gene Concert In Japan "Cross Show: Zedd" (2014)
- Cross Gene Concert In Seoul "Be Happy Together - X Mas Eve Night" (2015)
- Cross Gene Live In Japan "Be Happy Together - New Year Luv Night (2016)
- Cross Gene Live "Mirror" (2017)
- Cross Gene Japan Live "Utopia" (2018)

== Awards and nominations ==
=== Korea Cultural Entertainment Awards ===
Year	Nominee / work	Award	Result
2013	Cross Gene	K-Pop Rookie Award	Won
