= Dating Alone =

South Korean television series

- Hangul: 나홀로 연애중
- Hanja: 나홀로 戀愛中
- RR: Nahollo yeonaejung
- MR: Nahollo yŏnaejung
- Genre: Variety, Reality
- Country of origin: South Korea
- Original language: Korean
- No. of seasons: 1
- No. of episodes: 12

Production
- Running time: 80 minutes

Original release
- Network: JTBC
- Release: 1 February – 18 April 2015

Dating Alone (Korean: 나홀로 연애중) is a South Korean reality variety show that was broadcast from February 1, 2015, to April 18, 2015, where male guests participated in virtual dates with female celebrities who acted as virtual lovers. The show is a spin-off of the 2012 television series, Imagination Love Battle.

== Format ==
For every two episodes, a female celebrity is featured and acts as a virtual lover who the male participants in the show will go on a date with. The purpose of the show is to see if men know the minds of women, and to study how they act in each situation.

The participants, or 'players', each go behind a monitor, that allows them to choose actions or things to say for every scene in the video. Each action will earn the players different points, or even make them lose points. To make the scenes more realistic for the participants, though behind a screen in the studio, in certain scenes in the video such as eating, they are also given food, or during a running scene, they are on a treadmill.

The show has some elements of a typical dating sim such as scenes between the character, or the virtual lover of the show, and the player. Points also increase or decrease according to the player's actions throughout the game, or in this case, the show.

The show's fixed hosts participate in the date, but the show also invites male celebrities. Male celebrities have also been featured in the scenes, acting as the player's rival for the virtual girlfriend's affections.

On March 11, 2015, JTBC announced its first 'Virtual Boyfriend Special' featuring the actor Seo Kang-joon as the show's first virtual boyfriend. They also stated that Girls' Generation's Kwon Yuri who appeared as a virtual girlfriend in episodes 3 and 4 will be returning, but as a part of the panel.

== Hosts ==
- Kim Min-jong
- Jun Hyun-moo
- Sung Si-kyung
- Jang Dong-min
- Shin Won-ho

== Episodes ==
#	Broadcast date	Virtual Lover	Guest(s)	Notes
1 & 2	February 1, 2015 – February 7, 2015	Jung Eun-ji	Jinwoon	Cameo: Yook Sungjae
3 & 4	February 14, 2015 – February 21, 2015	Kwon Yuri	Jackson Wang	Cameo: Lee Seung-ho
5 & 6	February 28, 2015 – March 7, 2015	Kang Min-kyung	Zhang Yuan	Cameo: Kim Dong-jun
7 & 8	March 14, 2015 – March 21, 2015	Hani	Seo Ha-joon; Takuya Terada	Cameo: Heo Kyung-hwan
9 & 10	March 28, 2015 – April 4, 2015	Seo Kang-joon	Kwon Yuri; Shin Bong-sun; Kim Ji-min; Han Hye-jin	'Virtual Boyfriend Special'; Cameo: Hyuna (Nine Muses)
11 & 12	April 11, 2015 – April 18, 2015	Park Chanyeol	Min Dohee; Lady Jane; Han Hye-jin; Jang Do-yeon	Cameo: Woohee (Dalshabet)
