= Seoul Evita =

- Film poster
- Hangul: 서울, 에비타
- RR: Seoul, ebita
- MR: Sŏul, ebit'a
- Directed by: Park Chul-soo
- Written by: Kim Sung-hong; Lee Youn-taek
- Produced by: Hwang Gi-seong; Park Yong-bin
- Starring: Hwang Shin-hye; Park Sang-won
- Cinematography: Seo Jeong-min
- Edited by: Kim Hyeon
- Music by: Jo Yeong-nam
- Production company: Hwang Gi-seong Inc.
- Release date: May 25, 1991
- Running time: 113 minutes
- Country: South Korea
- Language: Korean

Seoul Evita (Korean: 서울, 에비타) is a 1991 South Korean musical romantic drama film directed by Park Chul-soo.

== Plot ==
A love story between a student activist and a musical student who share an apartment.

== Cast ==
- Hwang Shin-hye ... Lee Seon-yeong
- Park Sang-won ... Kim Min-su
- Jo Yeong-nam
- Jung Hye-sun
- Oh Seung-myeong
- Kim Seok-ok
- Kim Eun-suk
- Lee Ho-seong
- Jeong Woon-bong
- Kim Deok-nam
- Ahn Jong-hwan
