= Ŏu yadam =

16th–17th century Korean story collection

- Hangul: 어우야담
- Hanja: 於于野譚
- RR: Eou yadam
- MR: Ŏu yadam
- IPA: [ʌ.u jadam]

Ŏu yadam (Korean: 어우야담; Hanja: 於于野譚; pronounced [ʌ.u jadam]; lit. 'Ŏu's Unofficial Histories') is a collection of stories by Yu Mongin (유몽인, 1559–1623), a Korean scholar-official of the Joseon period. The title is composed of his art name, Ŏu, and yadam, which can be roughly translated as "unofficial histories" or "miscellaneous talks" in English. Ŏu yadam was written in classical Chinese, the written lingua franca of the time. It remains five volumes in one book although Ŏu yadam originally consisted of 10 volumes. It is regarded the progenitor of yadam, a body of collected stories that flourished in the late Joseon period. While some of his contemporaries praised Ŏu Yadam as written in a lucid, and succinct literary style, Eu Yadam was never published until the late 19th century because of Yu Mong-in's unfortunate political career, which bought the capital punishment for him and his son for the rumour that they plotted against the then-reigning King Injo. Eu yadam is cited in a number of Joseon literary works by scholars such as Jang Yu (1587–1638), Yi Ik (1681–1763), Jong Yak-yong (1762–1836), etc. At least thirty different editions of Ŏu yadam are extant. These were used by Yu Mongin's descendants to reconstruct Ŏu yadam. This version is called the Manjongjae version. A number of manuscripts are found at libraries such as National Library of Korea and Kyujanggak, Seoul, South Korea.

== Derivative work ==
- Legend of the Blue Sea

== See also ==
- History of Korea
- Korean literature
