= Ahn Suk-hwan =

South Korean actor (born 1959)

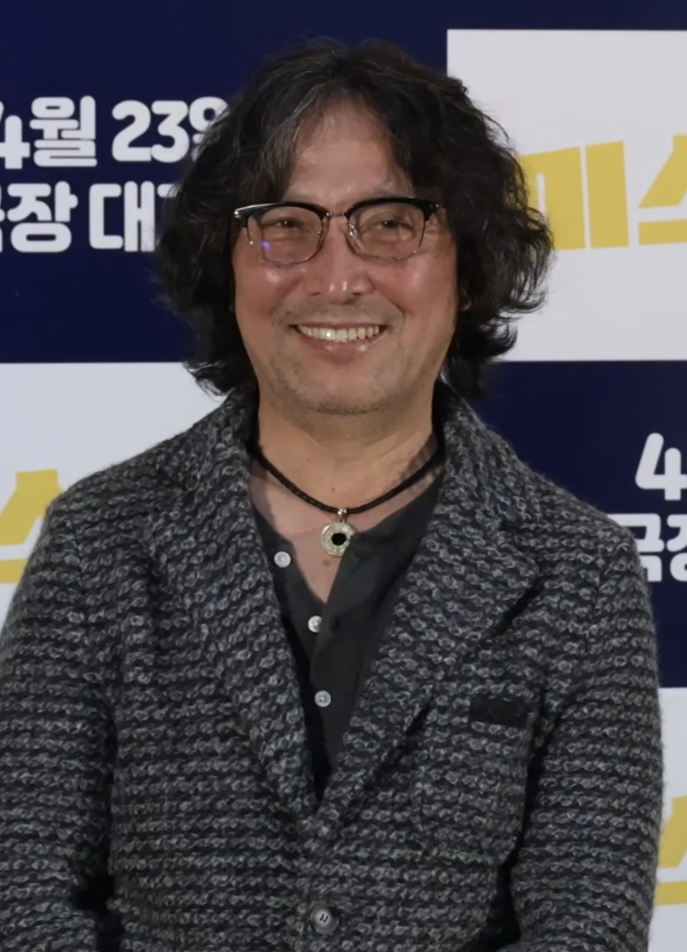
- Ahn in April 2026
- Born: November 1, 1959 (age 67); Paju, Gyeonggi Province, South Korea
- Education: Dankook University – Business Administration
- Occupation: Actor
- Years active: 1987–present

Korean name
- Hangul: 안석환
- Hanja: 安奭奐
- RR: An Seokhwan
- MR: An Sŏkhwan

Ahn Suk-hwan (Korean: 안석환; born November 1, 1959) is a South Korean actor. Ahn has been active in theater, film and television since 1986. His onscreen roles include both comedic and villainous supporting turns, among them a ruthless but humane prison warden in the film The Road Taken (2003), and a strict but loving father in the Hong sisters-penned drama Sassy Girl Chun-hyang (2005).

== Filmography ==
=== Film ===
Year	Title	Role	Notes
2016	Female Wars: The Man Who Moved In	Deok-man	
2015	Revivre	Director Ahn	Cameo
2015	Heartbreak Hotel	Boss	
2014	Quo Vadis	Pastor Gil	
2012	26 Years	Ahn Su-ho	
2012	The Concubine	Shin Ik-chul	
2012	Remembrance of MB	Narrator	
2011	Shotgun Love	Foodstall owner	
2007	My Father	Jang Min-ho	
2006	Mr. Wacky	Teacher Noh	Cameo
2004	Face	Dr. Yoon	
2003	The Road Taken	Oh Tae-shik	
2002	R. U. Ready?	Old Man Hwang	
2002	Bet On My Disco		
2002	Four Toes	F Killer	
2002	Public Enemy		
2001	My Wife Is a Gangster	Messenger	Cameo
2001	The Humanist	Bae Kyoung-wi	Cameo
2001	Dream of a Warrior		
2000	Just Do It	Jeong Byeong-hwan	
2000	The Siren		
2000	Dal Segno		short film
1999	Fin de Siecle		
1999	Tell Me Something	Prosecutor Gu	
1999	Doctor K	Wi Pyun-ho	cameo
1998	Paradise Lost	Eun-kyo's husband	
1997	No. 3	Kang Do-shik	
1996	The Real Man		
1996	A Petal		
1995	A Hot Roof	Cameraman	
1995	Gunman	Head of Department	
1994	To You From Me		
1994	The Taebaek Mountains		
1994	The Fox with Nine Tails		
1994	Tirano's Claw		
1993	My Beautiful		short film
1993	For Go-chul		short film
1992	Distance		
1992	Myong-ja, Akiko, Sonia		

=== Television series ===
Year	Title	Role	Notes/Ref.
2023	KBS Drama Special – "Shoot For Love"	Park Seok-hwan	one act-drama
2021–2022	The All-Round Wife	Bang Bae-su	Episode 45–122
2020–2023	The Uncanny Counter	Choi Jang-mul	Season 1–2
2020	Was It Love?	Island resident	Cameo, episode 8-9
2020	My Wonderful Life	Ki-shin	Cameo
2020	Kkondae Intern	Cheon Seok-ho	Cameo, episode 18 and 23-24
2020	Oh My Baby	Man flirting with Lee Ok-ran	Cameo, episode 16
2018–2019	Partners for Justice 2	No Han-shin	
2018	Clean with Passion for Now	Cha Seung-hwan	
2018	100 Days My Prince	Park Sun-do	
2018	Room No. 9	Bong Sa-dal	
2017	Live Up to Your Name	Shin Myung-hoon	
2017	The Rebel	No Sa-shin	
2017	The Guardians	Lawyer	Cameo, episode 32
2016	Come Back Mister	Cha Hee-jang	
2016	Local Hero	Park Sun-hoo	
2016	Entertainer	Kim Sung-nam	Cameo, episode 6
2015	Six Flying Dragons	Yuk San	
2015	Beating Again	Ma Tae-seok	
2015	Life Tracker Lee Jae-goo	Hwang Gil-san	
2015	Shine or Go Crazy	Kim Jong-shik	
2014	Liar Game	Lloyd Capital Investment CEO	Cameo, episode 11
2014	KBS Drama Special – "The Reason I Get Drunk"	Soo-geun	one-act drama
2014	The King's Face	Lee San-hae	
2014	Discovery of Love	Bae Min-soo	
2014	Gunman in Joseon	Kim Byung-je	
2013	Basketball	Min Tae-shin	
2013	Hold My Hand	Oh Shin-hee's father	
2013	The King's Daughter, Soo Baek-hyang	Baek Ga	
2013	Goddess of Fire	Toyotomi Hideyoshi	Cameo
2013	The Scandal	Jo Chi-gook	
2013	Ugly Alert	Kyung-tae's father	Cameo
2013	The Virus	Kim Do-jin	
2013	Flower of Revenge	Baek Doo-jin	
2012	Family Portrait	Han Sang-sik	
2012	Only Because It's You	Jack Black	
2012	Family	Yeol Srok-hwan	
2012	Big	Gil Min-gyu	
2012	Bridal Mask	Lee Shi-young	
2012	Tasty Life	Jo pyung-goo	
2012	Rooftop Prince	Yong Dong-man	
2012	Salamander Guru and The Shadows	Gang leader	Cameo, episode 2
2012	Take Care of Us, Captain	Lee Dong-chan	Cameo
2011	Deep Rooted Tree	Lee Shin-juk	
2011	Pianissimo		
2011	KBS Drama Special – "The Beeper"	Kim Gwang-soo	one-act drama
2011	Warrior Baek Dong-soo	Seo Yoo-dae	
2011	Paradise Ranch	Han Tae-man	
2011	Drama Special Series – "Special Crime Squad MSS"	Choi Du-il	one-act drama
2010	The King of Legend	Go Heung	
2010	Big Thing	Son Bon-shik	
2010	Personal Taste	Han Yup-sup	
2010	The Fugitive: Plan B		Cameo, episode 3
2010	The Slave Hunters	Bang Hwa-baek	
2009	Hometown Legends – "The Wooden Doll"	Kim Chu-seo	one-act drama
2009	Partner	Jae-ho's stepfather	Guest, episode 1-3
2009	Cinderella Man	Butler Ahn	
2009	Ja Myung Go	Prophet	Cameo
2009	Kyung-sook's Father	Mr. Choi	
2009	Boys Over Flowers	Geum Il-bong	
2008	White Lie	Seo Ho-ku	
2008	Hometown Legends – "Child, Let's Go to Cheong Mountain"	Chun-soo	one-act drama
2008	The Secret of Coocoo Island	Park Hae-chul	
2008	Painter of the Wind	Shin Han-pyeong	
2008	Spotlight	Ahn Joong-suk	
2008	Drama City – "Disciplinary Committee"	Public Information Officer	one-act drama
2008	Before and After: Plastic Surgery Clinic	Lee Eok-man	
2008	Hong Gil-dong	Seo Yun-seop	
2007	Drama City – "Old Punk Songs"		one-act drama
2007	Drama City – "The Dual Accounts Murder"		one -act drama
2007	Lobbyist		
2007	Capital Scandal	Ueda Mamoru	
2007	Witch Yoo Hee	Chae Byeong-seo	
2006	Drama City – "The Stars Shine Brightly"		one-act drama
2006	Drama City – "The Writer, the Actor, and the Apartment"		one-act drama
2006	KBS TV Novel – "Sunok"	Chang-soo	
2006	Farewell to Arms		
2006	Special Crime Investigation: Murder in the Blue House	Choi Joon	
2006	The Invisible Man, Choi Jang-soo	Kang Young-bok	
2006	Special of My Life		
2006	TV Literature – "Bad Story"	Officer Hoon	one-act drama
2005	Banjun Drama – "Dangerous Pupil"		one-act drama
2005	My Girl	Jang Il-do	
2005	Drama City – "Gopo Inn"		on-act drama
2005	Ballad of Seodong		
2005	Bizarre Bunch	Lee Byung-doo	
2005	Drama City – "Everyone, Cha Cha Cha!"		one-act drama
2005	KBS TV Novel – "Wind Flower"	Jang Eok-geun	
2005	Single Again	Jang Dae-geun	
2005	Rebirth: Next	Psychiatrist	Guest
2005	Drama City – "Barefoot Kae-jo"	Village Head	one-act drama
2005	Sassy Girl Chun-hyang	Mong-ryong's father	
2004	MBC Best Theater – "Very Merry Christmas"		one-act drama
2004	MBC Best Theater – "Tabloid Episode 1: Miss J's Truth"		one-act drama
2004	The Age of Heroes	Security Chief	
2004	Forbidden Love		Guest
2004	Beijing My Love	Seo Il-doo	
2003	Drama City – "Unstoppable Brother"		one-act drama
2003	Drama City – "Crime Free Village"		one-act drama
2003	Drama City – "São Paulo"		one-act drama
2003	Drama City – "The Queen of Disco"		one-act drama
2003	Drama City – "S Law and Under Scandal"		one-act drama
2003	Good Person	Goo Sang-jin	
2003	Snowman		
2003	Punch	Bong Gi-bong	
2002	Girl's High School Days	Park Jong-soo	
2000	Cruise of Love		
1999	Ghost	Bong-gu	
1999	Did We Really Love?		
1999	Young Sun	Han Jae-soo	
1998	White Nights 3.98		
1995	Jazz		Guest

== Theater ==
- The Bald Soprano (2011)
- Cyrano de Bergerac (2010)
- University of Laughs (2010)
- Noises Off (2006)
- Richard III (2004)
- Art (2003)
- Gasigogi (A Thorny Fish) (2001)
- Woman of Flames, Na Hye-seok (2000)
- People of the Jurassic (1998)
- 이 풍진 세상의 노래 (1998)
- Men's Impulse (1997)
- Waiting for Godot (1994-2002)

== Awards ==
- 2012 1st K-Drama Star Awards: Best Comic Acting (Family)
- 2005 KBS Drama Awards: Best Supporting Actor (Bizarre Bunch, Sassy Girl Chun-hyang)
- 1998 Young Artist of Today Award
- 1998 34th Dong-A Theatre Awards: Best Actor (Men's Impulse)
- 1998 National Theater Association of Korea: Best Actor (Excellence Award)
- 1997 International Theater Festival: Most Popular Theater Actor
- 1997 National Theater Association of Korea: Most Popular Actor in the First Half of 1997
- 1997 National Theater Association of Korea: Best Actor (Top Excellence Award)
- 1996 33rd Dong-A Theatre Awards: Best Actor (이 세상 끄으읕)
- 1996 Seoul Performing Arts Festival: Grand Prize (Daesang)
