= Hwang Shin-hye =

South Korean actress (born 1963)

Hwang Shin-Hye
- Born: Hwang Jung-Man; April 16, 1963 (age 63); Incheon, South Korea
- Other name: Hwang Cine
- Education: Inha Technical College
- Occupation: Actress
- Years active: 1983–present
- Agent: Cube Entertainment
- Spouse: Park Min-Seo (m. 1998; div. 2005)
- Children: Lee Jin-Yi (daughter)

Korean name
- Hangul: 황정만
- RR: Hwang Jeongman
- MR: Hwang Chŏngman

Stage name
- Hangul: 황신혜
- RR: Hwang Sinhye
- MR: Hwang Sinhye

Hwang Shin-Hye (Korean: 황신혜; born April 16, 1963), birth name Hwang Jung-Man (황정만), is a South Korean actress.

== Career ==
Hwang Shin-Hye was studying to become a flight attendant at Inha Technical College, established in 1958 as an annex to Inha Institute of Technology (parent institution of Inha University), when she began her career as a model for Taepyeongyang Cosmetics. In 1983, while still a student, she made her acting debut in the television drama Father and Son and quickly gained fame as "the most perfect face in Korea." Her first film was Bae Chang-ho's 1987 melodrama Our Sweet Days of Youth, in which she played a divorcee who marries her true love. She would also go on to star in a large number of films by director Park Chul-soo, beginning with The Woman Who Walks on Water.

Starting 1995, she took on more diverse roles, including that of a woman with an eating disorder in 301, 302, a gynecologist in Push! Push!, and a wife who sues her husband's company for depriving her of a sex life in Bedroom and Courtroom.

Hwang's last film was the 2002 gangster comedy Family, in which she played a room salon madam. After the TV series Match Made in Heaven in 2004, she went on a five-year hiatus from acting, but remained in the public eye by releasing a book and video on health and lifestyle in 2005, and for launching a successful line of women's lingerie named Elypry in 2006. Hwang also began hosting talk shows such as The Queen and Talk Club Actors, and the long-running makeover show Let Me In.

Hwang resumed her acting career in 2009, with both leading and supporting roles in the romantic comedy The Queen Returns (2009), the mystery drama Home Sweet Home (2010), the melodrama Bachelor's Vegetable Store (2011), and the sitcom Family (2012).

In December 2025, Hwang signed with new agency Cube Entertainment.

== Personal life ==
Hwang Shin-Hye married businessman Park Min-Seo in 1998, but the marriage ended in divorce in May 2005. They have one daughter, Lee Jin-Yi (born Park Ji-Young on January 26, 1999), who is also a model and actress.

== Filmography ==
=== Television series ===
Year	Title	Role
1983	Father and Son	
1983	MBC Bestseller Theater: "The Windmills of My Mind"	
1984	MBC Bestseller Theater: "Three Women Under the Umbrella"	
1984	True Love For Wife	
1985	Eulalia Grass	Hae Bang-Yi
1986	First Love	Jang Hye-Jin
1987	Terms of Endearment	Kim Won-Joo
1989	A Happy Woman	Song Yeo-Kyung
1990	Ddombanggakha	Ryu Choon-Hye
1990	Years of Ambition	Han Ji-Hye
1991	Do You Know Eun Ha-Soo	Han Eun-Ji
1992	Calendula	Han Ji-Woo
1992	Ambitions on Sand	Yoo Hye-Min
1994	There is No Love	Lee Hwa-Young
1995	Thaw	Kang Hyun-Jung
1995	Korea Gate	Suzy Park
1996	Lovers	Yoon Yeo-Kyung
1997	Cinderella	Jang Hye-Jin
2000	Legends of Love	Jung Young-Hee
2000	Rookie	Jo Soo-Mi
2002	Man in Crisis	Park Geum-Hee
2004	Match Made in Heaven	Hwang Jong-Hee
2009	The Queen Returns	Jang Gong-Shim
2010	Home Sweet Home	Mo Yoon-Hee
2011	Bachelor's Vegetable Store	Choi Kang-Sun
2012	Family	Woo Shin-Hye
2013	Passionate Love	Hong Nan-Cho
2015	The Producers	Herself (ep.1-2)
2015	It's Okay Because I Am a Mom	Na Jong-Hee
2016	The Legend of the Blue Sea	Kang Seo-Hee
2020–2021	Homemade Love Story	Kim Jung-won
2021–2022	Love Twist	Park Hee-ok

=== Films ===
Year	Title	Role
1987	Our Sweet Days of Youth	Hye-Rin
1989	Gagman	Oh Sun-Young
1990	The Dream	Dal-Rye
1990	The Woman Who Walks on Water	Nan-Hee
1991	Seoul Evita	Lee Sun-Young
1991	Theresa's Lover	Theresa
1994	Absolute Love	Eun-Joo
1995	301, 302	Yoon-Hee
1995	Korean National Flower	Shin Yoon-Mi
1997	Push! Push!	Han Jung-Yeon
1998	A Killing Story	Marie
1998	Bedroom and Courtroom	Lee Kyung-Ja
2000	Love Bakery	Han Jung-Hee
2002	Family	Oh Hae-Sook

=== Variety shows ===
Year	Title	Notes
2008	The Queen	Host
2011–2015	Let Me In	Host
2013	Talk Club Actors	Host
2022	Mother Was Pretty	Host

== Bibliography ==
Year	Title	Publisher
2005	Style by Cine	Image Box

== Awards and nominations ==
=== Grand Bell Awards ===
Year	Nominated work	Category	Result
1991	The Woman Who Walks on Water	Best Actress	Nominated
1991	The Woman Who Walks on Water	Popularity Award, Actress	Won

=== Baeksang Arts Awards ===
Year	Nominated work	Category	Result
1991	The Woman Who Walks on Water	Best Actress – Film	Nominated
1991	Years of Ambition	Most Popular Actress – Television	Won
1997	Lovers	Best Actress – Television	Nominated
1998	Cinderella	Best Actress – Television	Won

=== Blue Dragon Film Awards ===
Year	Nominated work	Category	Result
1990	The Woman Who Walks on Water	Best Leading Actress	Nominated
1990	The Woman Who Walks on Water	Popular Star Award	Won
1991	Seoul Evita	Best Leading Actress	Nominated

=== KBS Drama Awards ===
Year	Nominated work	Category	Result
2020	Homemade Love Story	Excellence Award, Actress in a Serial Drama	Nominated

=== MBC Drama Awards ===
Year	Nominated work	Category	Result
1984	Father and Son	Best New Actress	Won
1986	First Love	Excellence Award, Actress	Won
1996	Lovers	Top Excellence Award, Actress	Won
1997	Cinderella	Top Excellence Award, Actress	Won
2004	Match Made in Heaven	Top Excellence Award, Actress	Nominated

=== SBS Drama Awards ===
Year	Nominated work	Category	Result
2013	Passionate Love	Top Excellence Award, Actress in a Weekend/Daily Drama	Nominated
2016	The Legend of the Blue Sea	Excellence Award, Actress in a Fantasy Drama	Nominated

=== Grimae Awards ===
Year	Nominated work	Category	Result
1996	Lovers	Best Actress	Won

=== Korea Broadcasting Producer Awards ===
Year	Nominated work	Category	Result
1997	Cinderella	Best Performer	Won

=== KBS Entertainment Awards ===
Year	Nominated work	Category	Result
2012	Family	Excellence Award, Actress in a Variety Show	Won
