= Shin Sung-woo =

South Korean singer and actor

- Born: Shin Dong-yoon; July 26, 1968 (age 58); Seosan, South Chungcheong, South Korea
- Education: Chung-Ang University - Sculpture
- Occupations: Singer; actor
- Years active: 1992–present
- Agent: Tommy & Partners
- Spouse: Unknown (m. 2016)
- Children: 2

Korean name
- Hangul: 신동륜
- Hanja: 申東倫
- RR: Sin Dongryun
- MR: Sin Tongnyun

Stage name
- Hangul: 신성우
- RR: Sin Seongu
- MR: Sin Sŏngu
- Website: shinsungwoo.com

Shin Sung-woo (born Shin Dong-yoon; July 26, 1968) is a South Korean singer and actor. He was very popular as a rock star in the 90s with his song "Seoshi". He then went into acting, stage/musical plays and up to this time has been active in both.

== Discography ==
=== Solo artist ===
- 내일을 향해 Towards Tomorrow (1992)
- Eight Smiles of Klein (1993)
- Shinsungwoo 003 (1994)
- For (1995)
- Mauve (1998)
- Identity (2000)
- 2002 Shin Sung-woo (compilation album, 2002)
- "I Swear" (track from First Love OST, 2003)
- 遭遇 (조우) Encounter (compilation album, 2006)
- "To an Old Friend" (track from Telecinema Project Vol.2, 2009)
- "Stagnant" (track from Warrior Baek Dong-soo OST, 2011)

=== Geenie ===
- Cool World (1995)
- Elephant (1996)

== Filmography ==
=== Television series ===
- Love Story: "Miss Hip-Hop and Mr. Rock" (SBS, 2000)
- Man in Crisis (MBC, 2002)
- MBC Best Theater: "Flower" (MBC, 2003)
- Country Princess (MBC, 2003)
- First Love (SBS, 2003)
- Beautiful Temptation (KBS2, 2004)
- Midnight DJ (SBS, 2004)
- Tropical Nights in December (MBC, 2004)
- Beating Heart (MBC, 2005)
- Rehearsal (MBC, 2005)
- MBC Best Theater: "A Sweet Villainess Has Come to Me" (MBC, 2005)
- MBC Best Theater: "May, June" (MBC, 2005)
- Special of My Life (MBC, 2006)
- Super Rookie Ranger (MBC, 2006)
- It's Okay Because I Love You (KBS2, 2007)
- The Secret of Coocoo Island (MBC, 2008)
- Home Sweet Home (MBC, 2010)
- Mom (MBC, 2015-2016)
- Moorim School: Saga of the Brave (KBS2, 2016)
- Dear My Friends (tvN, 2016)
- Tempted (MBC, 2018)
- The Penthouse: War in Life 3 (SBS, 2021) / as Clark Lee Cameo (Episode 7)
- The Killer's Shopping List (tvN, 2022) / as Young-chun

=== Film ===
- Detective Mr. Gong (2006)
- After the Banquet (2009)

=== Variety show ===
- Roommate (SBS, 2014) - season 1 cast member
- Real Life Men and Women (MBN, 2018) - season 1, cast member

== Musical theatre ==
- Dracula (1998)
- Rock Hamlet (2000)
- Rock of Ages (2010)
- Jack the Ripper (2011-2014)
- The Three Musketeers (2011-2014)
- Mozart, the Rock Opera (2012)
- Gone with the Wind (2014-2015)
- Chess (2015)
- Jack the Ripper (2021–2022) as Jack
- The Three Musketeers (2022) as Athos
- Dracula (2022–2023) as Dracula
