= Gong Hyun-joo =

South Korean actress (born 1984)

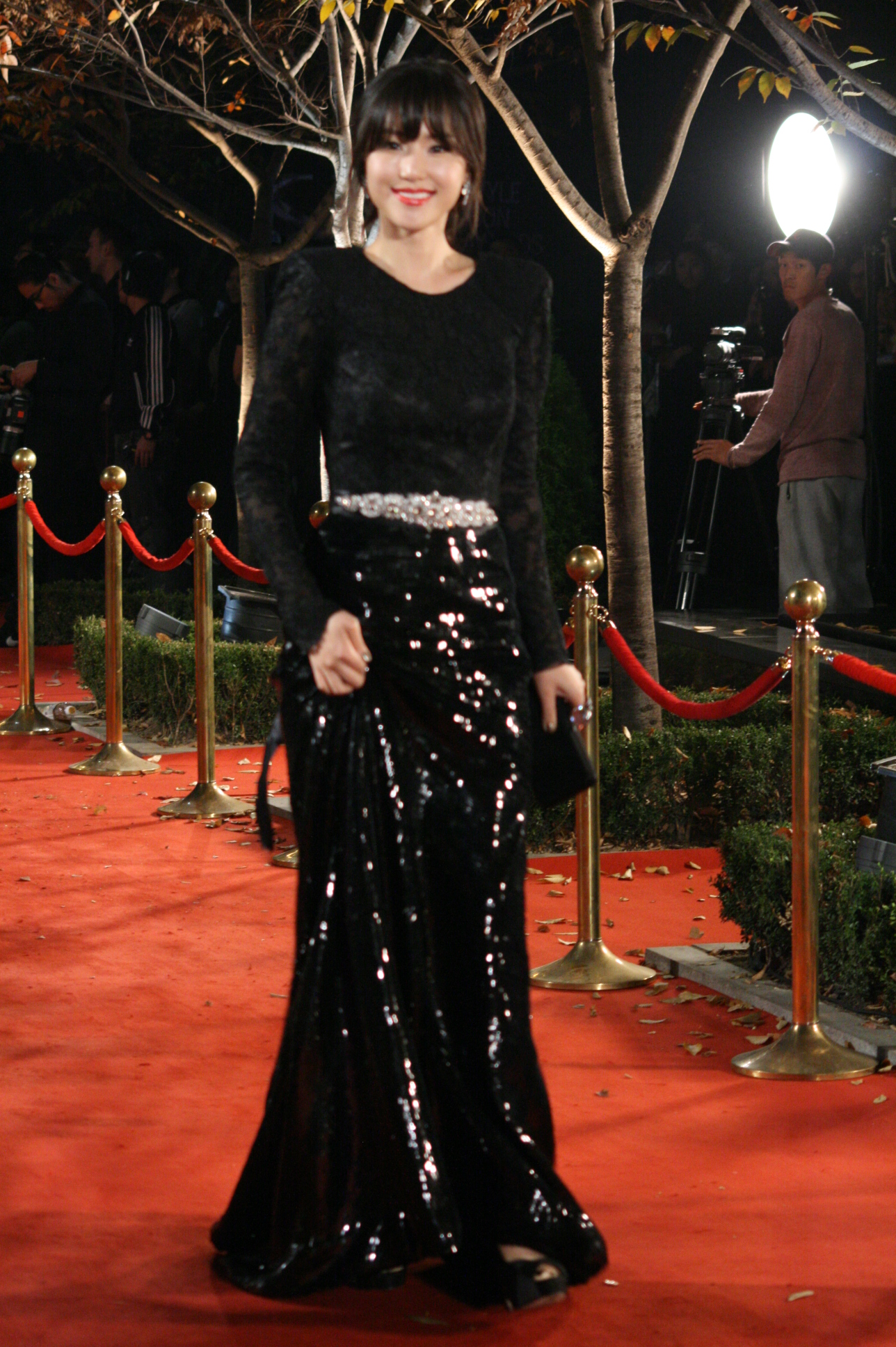
- Gong in 2011
- Born: January 7, 1984 (age 42); Songpa District, Seoul, South Korea
- Other name: Kong Hyun-joo
- Education: Dongduk Women's University – Broadcasting Entertainment
- Occupation: Actress
- Years active: 2001–present
- Agent: Kang Entertainment
- Spouse: Unknown (m. 2019)
- Children: 2

Korean name
- Hangul: 공현주
- RR: Gong Hyeonju
- MR: Kong Hyŏnju

Gong Hyun-joo (Korean: 공현주, born January 7, 1984) is a South Korean actress.

== Personal life ==
Gong married a non-celebrity 1 year older than her in March 2019. In January 2023, Gong's agency announced that she is pregnant with the couple's first child and expected to give birth in July 2023. Gong gave birth to fraternal twins, a boy and a girl, on June 2, 2023.

== Filmography ==
=== Television series ===
Year	Title	Role	Ref.
2003	All In	casino dealer	
2004	Wives on Strike	Jo Joon-gi's disciple	
2004	You're Not Alone	Gong Hyun-joo	
2005	Wedding	Oh Soo-ji	
2007	Flowers for My Life	Oh Nam-kyung	
2007	Golden Bride	Cha In-kyung	
2008	You Are My Destiny	Kim Soo-bin	
2012	Dummy Mommy	Han Soo-in	
2013	Family	Lee Hee-jae	
2014	Can We Fall in Love, Again?	Shin Yoon-ha	
2014	Hotel King	Cha Soo-an	
2015	Beating Again	Han Ji-hyun	
2016	Bubbly Lovely	Han Chae-rin	
2019	Graceful Family	Baek Soo-jin	
2021	High Class	Cha Do-young	

=== Web series ===
Year	Title	Role	Notes	Ref.
2022	Weak Hero Class 1	Yeon Shi-eun's mother	Special appearance	

=== Film ===
Year	Title	Role
2018	Brothers in Heaven	Cha Min-kyung
2019	Homme Fatale	Yoo-jung

=== Theater ===
Year	Title	Note(s)
2018	"Yeodo" (여도)	

=== Variety show ===
Year	Title	Note(s)/Ref.
2015	Law of the Jungle in Samoa	Cast member (Episodes 192–194)
2016	Real Men – Female Special	Cast member (Edition 4)
2018	Real Life Men and Women	Cast member (Season 1)

=== Music video appearances ===
Year	Song title	Artist
2007	"Bad Guy"	Kim Jong-wook
2008	"Getting Further Apart" (멀어지다)	Nell

== Advertisements ==
Brand	Product
Bogwang Phoenix Park	Phoenix Park
Samsung Card	
Biltmore	
