= Family (2012 TV series) =

- Promotional poster
- Also known as: Shut Up Family
- Genre: Sitcom; Family; Comedy; Romance
- Written by: Seo Jae-won; Kim Hwan-chae; Lee Jeong-sun; Kwon So-ra; Kim Ba-da
- Directed by: Jo Joon-hee; Choi Sung-beom
- Starring: Hwang Shin-hye; Ahn Suk-hwan; Park Ji-yoon; Park Hee-von
- Composer: Kim Han-jo
- Country of origin: South Korea
- Original language: Korean
- No. of episodes: 120

Production
- Executive producer: Lee Hwang-sun
- Producers: Choi Jun-seong; Kim Hyeong-seob
- Cinematography: Moon Se-heung; Yoo Jin-ha
- Editors: Lee Hyeon-ah; Kim Byung-rok
- Production company: Kairos Enterprise

Original release
- Network: KBS2
- Release: August 13, 2012 – February 6, 2013

Family (Korean: 패밀리) is a 2012 South Korean family sitcom starring Hwang Shin-hye, Ahn Suk-hwan, Park Ji-yoon and Park Hee-von. It aired on KBS2 from August 13, 2012 to February 6, 2013, on Mondays to Fridays at 19:45 for 120 episodes.

It is also known under its previous title Shut Up Family (Korean: 닥치고 패밀리; RR: Dakchigo paemilli).

== Plot ==
Woo Shin-hye is a divorcee who lives with her vain mother and two beautiful daughters — the older one who cares deeply about her image but is secretly a slob, and the younger who is intelligent and seemingly kind, but has a sly and cruel personality. They are filthy rich thanks to Shin-hye's beauty salon. Yeol Suk-hwan is a widowed and enthusiastic single father who works at a Youth Centre to support his poor family. He lives with his greedy but kind mother-in-law, and three children — two sons, the oldest who is a bread errand boy and is bullied in school, and the youngest who is an innocent but slow child, as well as a smart, strong but homely daughter who others mistake for an older woman.

Shin-hye and Suk-hwan unexpectedly fall in love and marry. Now that the two families live under the same roof, conflicts constantly arise due to differences in personalities and lifestyles. However, they work their problems together and help each other out, successfully or not, and they eventually become a real family.

== Cast ==
Woo family

- Hwang Shin-hye as Woo Shin-hye
- Park Ji-yoon as Woo Ji-yoon
- Kim Da-som as Woo Da-yoon
- Sunwoo Yong-nyeo as Na Il-ran
- Lee Bon as Woo Bon

Yeol family

- Ahn Suk-hwan as Yeol Suk-hwan
- Park Hee-von as Yeol Hee-bong
- Choi Woo-shik as Yeol Woo-bong
- Kim Dan-yool as Yeol Mak-bong
- Nam Neung-mi as Goong Ae-ja
- Kim Hyung-beom as Yeol Hyung-beom

E Coffee

- Shim Ji-ho as Cha Ji-ho
- Min Chan-gi as Al
- Park Seo-joon as Cha Seo-joon

Extended cast

- Park Sung-kwang as Goong Sang-in
- Kim Dong-beom as Bin Dae-chul
- Wang Ji-won as instructor
- Choi Ha-na as Choi Ha-na
- Han Yeo-wool as Han Yeo-wool
- Joo Young-ho as Joo Young-ho

Cameo appearance

- Kim Won-hyo as aesthetic goose customer couple
- Shin Jin-hwa as aesthetic goose customer couple
- Jung Kyung-mi as Mak-bong's homeroom teacher
- Shin Bo-ra as drunk and crazy fan of Hyung-beom's
- Yoon Bo-ra as herself
- Bang Min-ah as a character in Woo-bong's fan fiction novel
- Yura as a character in Woo-bong's fan fiction novel
- Choi Ah-ra as Shin Jang-mi
- Kim Jae-kyung as Yoon Yoo-mi
- Ji Soo as Han Song-yi
- Jo Kwan-woo as Shin-hye's ex-husband
- Park Hwi-soon as university group senior
- Song Ji-eun as high school girl stalker
- K.Will as Roy Kwak
- Jeong Ga-eun as Mi-ja
- Gong Hyun-joo as Lee Hee-jae
- Jeong Jin-woon as Kang Dong-won
- Si-hwan as Seo-joon's classmate

== Awards ==
- 2012 K-Drama Star Awards: Best Comic Acting - Ahn Suk-hwan
- 2012 KBS Entertainment Awards: Excellence Award, Female Performer in a Variety Show - Hwang Shin-hye
