= Home Sweet Home (2010 TV series) =

2010 South Korean television series

- Promotional poster
- Also known as: My Happy Home; My Sweet Home
- Genre: Mystery; Melodrama
- Directed by: Oh Kyung-hoon; Lee Sung-joon
- Starring: Kim Hye-soo; Hwang Shin-hye
- Music by: Oh Joon Sung
- Country of origin: South Korea
- Original language: Korean
- No. of episodes: 16

Production
- Producer: Han Hee (MBC)
- Production company: Pan Entertainment

Original release
- Network: MBC TV
- Release: October 27 – December 23, 2010

Home Sweet Home (Korean: 즐거운 나의 집; RR: Jeulgeoun naui jip) is a 2010 South Korean television series. The mystery melodrama starring Kim Hye-soo and Hwang Shin-hye aired on Wednesday and Thursday nights on MBC TV from October 27 to December 23, 2010 at 9:55 p.m.

== Plot ==
Kim Jin-seo (Kim Hye-soo) is a psychiatrist out to uncover the truth behind the death of Sung Eun-pil (Kim Kap-soo). In doing so, Kim realizes that the deceased Sung's wife, Mo Yoon-hee (Hwang Shin-hye), may not only have been involved in Sung's death but that she has also been having an affair with Kim's husband, Lee Sang-hyun (Shin Sung-woo).

== Cast ==
- Kim Hye-soo as Kim Jin-seo
- Hwang Shin-hye as Mo Yoon-hee
- Shin Sung-woo as Lee Sang-hyun
- Lee Sang-yoon as Kang Shin-woo
- Youn Yuh-jung as Sung Eun-sook (Eun-pil's sister)
- Kim Kap-soo as Sung Eun-pil (Yoon-hee's husband)
- Lee Eui-jung as Kim Jin-hye (Jin-seo's sister)
- Song Young-kyu as Heo Young-min (Jin-hye's husband)
- Jung Hye-sun as Park Dool-nam (Jin-seo's mother-in-law)
- Nam Da-reum as Lee Min-jo (Jin-seo's son)
- Jung Joo-eun as Han Hee-soo
- Lee Seol-ah as Sung Eun-jae
- Choi Su-rin as Jo Soo-min
- Lee Jung-sung as Lawyer Go
- Jung Won-joong as Tak Kyung-hwan
- Jung Jin-gak as Woo Jang-soon
- Song Min-hyung as Choi Byung-dal
- Han Min-chae as Curator Choi
- Kim Young-hoon as Assistant Kim

== Awards ==
2010 MBC Drama Awards

- Best New Actor - Lee Sang-yoon
- PD Award - Oh Kyung-hoon
- Achievement Award - Jung Hye-sun
