= Cinderella Man (TV series) =

2009 South Korean television series

- Promotional poster for Cinderella Man
- Hangul: 신데렐라 맨
- RR: Sinderelra maen
- MR: Sinderella maen
- Genre: Romance; Drama
- Written by: Cho Yoon-young
- Directed by: Yeo Jeong-joon
- Starring: Kwon Sang-woo; Im Yoon-ah; Han Eun-jung; Song Chang-eui
- Country of origin: South Korea
- Original language: Korean
- No. of episodes: 16

Production
- Executive producer: Kim Kwang-soo
- Production companies: MBC; MBK Entertainment

Original release
- Network: MBC TV
- Release: April 15 – June 4, 2009

Cinderella Man (Korean: 신데렐라 맨) is a 2009 Korean drama directed by Yeo Jeong-Joon and starring Kwon Sang-woo and Im Yoon-ah as the main protagonists. The drama is about lookalikes Oh Dae-san and Lee Jun-hee (both played by Kwon Sang-woo) who live very different lives. It was first aired on April 15, 2009, and was last aired on June 4, 2009.

== Synopsis ==
Modeled after a more modern, masculine version of Cinderella. Dae-san is a clothing designer who operates a small shop in Dongdaemun Market and dreams of wealth. He meets Joon-hee one day, the heir of a fashion empire, who invites him to become him. Eventually, Dae-sun outsmarts the boss, Lee Jae-min, and eventually finds true love.

== Cast ==
=== Main characters ===
- Oh Dae-san played by Kwon Sang-woo

Sells clothes in the back alleys of Dongdaemun Market and obsesses about getting rich. Tall and handsome, he is a hustler and dresses well as he marches ahead on the road towards becoming a successful merchant. Growing up as an orphan, he does not fear failure nor does he trust anyone. He meets Lee Joon-hee, heir to a fashion empire, and when Lee sees that Dae-san looks just like him, he asks him if he would switch places with him...

- Lee Joon-hee played by Kwon Sang-woo

Second son of the founder of a fashion empire and heir apparent. He is tall and has an athletic build. He's handsome and has a sharp eye for style. But he is arrogant and hates complications in his life. He was sent off to France where he spent 19 years of his life. Upon hearing about his father's illness, he returns to Korea and his grandmother, the chairwoman of the company, makes him take a managerial position at the company. Having a heart problem just like his late mother, he asks Oh Dae-san, who is his lookalike, to pose as him for a month so that he can secretly get a heart operation without anyone in his family knowing about his medical condition. And with that he goes off to Paris for his operation...

- Seo Yoo-jin played by Im Yoon-ah

An aspiring designer. She has a sharp sense of style and a lot of pride. One of the star graduates of a famous Paris fashion design school, she starts from the bottom in the fashion industry by working for Dae-san when her father, a clothes wholesaler, suddenly passes away. She doesn't get along with Dae-san and constantly quarrels with him. By chance she meets the rich Lee Jae-min again whom she met before in Paris. His family owns a fashion empire and she can't make up her mind whether to choose Jae-min or Dae-san, whom she has gradually grown fond of.

- Jang Sae-eun's played by Han Eun-jung

The only daughter of the founder of a mutual fund empire. She studied fashion design overseas. Having sultry good looks, she did model gigs during her high school years. She is very conscious about the latest fashion trends. During her time abroad, she regrets turning down Jae-min when he proposed marriage to her, and so she wants to give him a second chance to rekindle their relationship. But she gets upset when Jae-min doesn't show much of an interest in her. Then she spots Oh Dae-san and is attracted to his street smarts.

- Lee Jae-min played by Song Chang-eui

Eldest son in the family that owns a fashion empire. As Joon-hee's stepbrother, he makes decisions after weighing all the options before him and has impeccable manners. He is at odds with his step-grandmother, who wishes to hand over the reins of the company to her grandson Joon-hee, who also happens to be a talented businessman. The only woman who gives him comfort is Seo Yoo-jin, whom he met in Paris but he figures that he must marry Jang Sae-eun whose family is very wealthy and influential...

=== Supporting characters ===
- Jung Hye-sun as Company owner Kang Ju-ok
- Yoo Hye-ri as Lady Oh Seon-yeong
- Ahn Suk-hwan as Steward Ahn
- Jeong Gyoo-soo as Director Shin Ki-cheol
- Lee Byung-joon as Elegance Choi
- Jung Woo as Ma Yi-san
- Kim Min-hee as Team leader Lee
- Kang Dong-yeob as Kim Dong-hyeon
- Ryoo Sang-wook as Park Seung-jae
- Lee Yeon-doo as Kang Yoon-jeong
- Lee Kyung-jin as Yoo-jin's mother
- Jang Jung-hee as Lee Kkeut-soon
- Kwon Tae-won as Company president Park
- Hwang Eun-jeong as 3 hundred million
- Ra Mi-ran as Velvet Lee
- Lim Hyeok-pil as B-Boy Dancer meeting MC
- Son Ho-jun as Yeo Jeong Min
- Kil Yong-woo as Yoo-jin's father - Cameo
- Sa Mi-ja - Cameo
- Ahn Nae-sang - Cameo
- Lee Dae-yeon - Cameo
- Lee Il-hwa - Cameo
- Jeon Soo-kyeong - Cameo
- Lee Hye-eun - Cameo
- Choi Soo-rin - Cameo
- Jung Jin as orphanage director - Cameo (ep 15)
- Jeong Byeong-cheol - as shopping street promotion president
- Shin Na-ri
- Kim Min-jwa as Ae-ran
- Lee Sang-bong

== Ratings ==
In the tables below, the blue numbers represent the lowest ratings and the red numbers represent the highest ratings.

Episode	Date	Seoul	Korea
1	April 15, 2009	9.3% (16th)	9.9% (14th)
2	April 16, 2009	6.7% (NR)	7.3% (NR)
3	April 22, 2009	7.6% (NR)	7.9% (17th)
4	April 23, 2009	7.0% (20th)	7.4% (NR)
5	April 29, 2009	8.2% (19th)	8.9% (15th)
6	April 30, 2009	8.5% (16th)	8.4% (15th)
7	May 6, 2009	10.2% (12th)	11.0% (10th)
8	May 7, 2009	8.5% (17th)	9.1% (14th)
9	May 13, 2009	7.9% (18th)	8.6% (16th)
10	May 14, 2009	8.6% (13th)	8.9% (14th)
11	May 20, 2009	8.6% (16th)	8.6% (14th)
12	May 21, 2009	8.1% (NR)	9.0% (16th)
13	May 27, 2009	8.3% (18th)	8.9% (17th)
14	May 28, 2009	7.8% (NR)	8.9% (NR)
15	June 3, 2009	8.0% (19th)	8.0% (NR)
16	June 4, 2009	8.6% (17th)	8.8% (15th)
Average		8.2%	-

Source: TNS Media Korea
