= The Lover (TV series) =

- Promotional poster
- Genre: Romance, Comedy
- Written by: Kim Min-seok
- Directed by: Kim Tae-eun; Jung Min-seok
- Starring: Oh Jung-se; Ryu Hyun-kyung; Jung Joon-young; Choi Yeo-jin; Park Jong-hwan; Ha Eun-seol; Takuya Terada; Lee Jae-joon
- Composer: Hong Sung-hyeon
- Country of origin: South Korea
- Original language: Korean
- No. of episodes: 12

Production
- Executive producer: Oh Gwang-seok
- Producer: Shim Hyung-gwan
- Production location: South Korea
- Cinematography: Bae Ji-seong
- Editors: Jung Il-won; Kim Hae-ni
- Running time: 50 minutes Thursdays at 23:00 (KST)
- Production company: Mnet

Original release
- Network: Mnet
- Release: April 2 – June 25, 2015

The Lover (Korean: 더 러버) is a 2015 South Korean television series starring Oh Jung-se, Ryu Hyun-kyung, Jung Joon-young, Choi Yeo-jin, Park Jong-hwan, Ha Eun-seol, Takuya Terada and Lee Jae-joon. It aired on Mnet from April 2 to June 25, 2015 on Thursdays at 23:00 for 12 episodes.

== Plot ==
The Lover is an omnibus series that depicts four different couples living together in one apartment complex.

Room 609: Both in their thirties, Oh Do-si is a voice actor and Ryu Doo-ri is a blogger. They simply chose to live together instead of getting married, and have been sharing an apartment for two years.

Room 610: Jung Young-joon and Choi Ji-nyeo are a couple that's twelve years apart in age. Ji-nyeo has the personality of a penny-pinching ajumma and basically supports her younger boyfriend in the hope that he will someday realize his dream, while Young-joon is an unemployed musician who carries around a guitar he doesn't know how to play. They've been dating for two years, living together for a year, and are quick to fight and make up.

Room 510: Park Hwan-jong and Ha Seol-eun are in their twenties and have just moved in together. Seol-eun wants her boyfriend to believe that she's the perfect embodiment of femininity, and works tirelessly to keep up the illusion.

Room 709: Lee Joon-jae is a loner who prefers to stay at home, but is forced to find a roommate for financial reasons. He doesn't even want to exchange unnecessary small talk so he advertises for a foreigner who can't speak Korean very well. Enter Takuya, a Japanese guy on his travels. Takuya thinks Joon-jae is wasting his youth, and begins to draw him out into the world. Feeling involved.

== Cast ==
- Oh Jung-se as Oh Do-si
- Ryu Hyun-kyung as Ryu Doo-ri
- Jung Joon-young as Jung Young-joon
- Choi Yeo-jin as Choi Jin-nyeo
- Park Jong-hwan as Park Hwan-jong
- Ha Eun-seol as Ha Seol-eun
- Takuya Terada as Takuya
- Lee Jae-joon as Lee Joon-jae
- Sung Kyu-chan as Sung Min-jae
- Kang Kyun-sung as Ryu Sung-kyun (cameo, ep 1)
- Bae Woo-hee as Herself (cameo, ep. 6)
