= Takuya Terada =

Japanese singer and actor

- 寺田拓哉
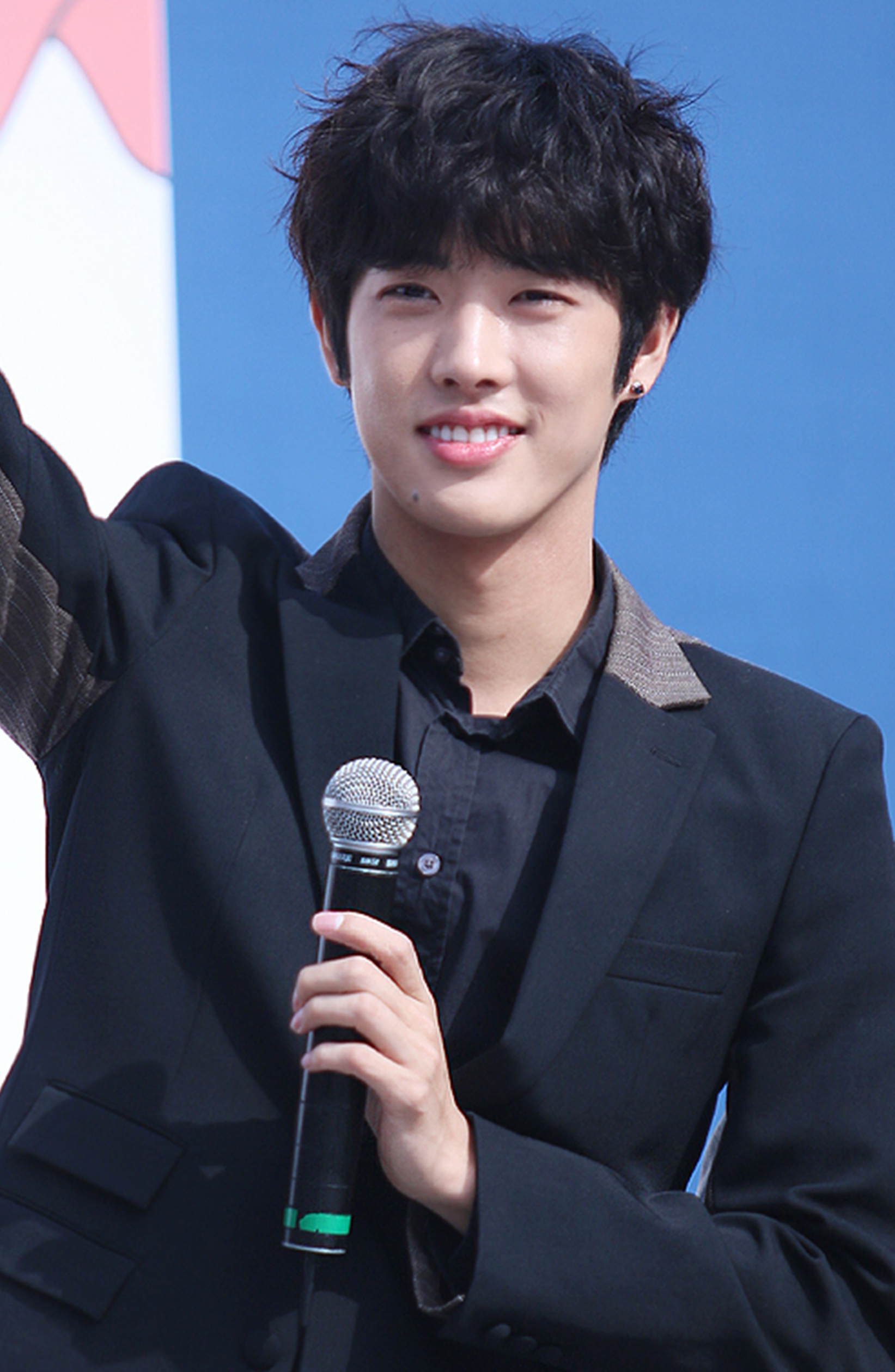
- Terada in October 2014.
- Born: March 18, 1992 (age 34); Moriya, Ibaraki, Japan
- Occupations: Actor; singer; model
- Years active: 2009–present
- Agent: Different Company
- Musical career
- Genres: K-pop; J-pop
- Instruments: Vocals; piano; guitar
- Label: Amuse Korea
- Formerly of: Cross Gene

Takuya Terada (寺田拓哉, Terada Takuya; born March 18, 1992) is a Japanese actor, singer and model. He was a member of the Korean boy group Cross Gene. Takuya is also well known as the former Japanese Representative on Korean variety television Show, JTBC's Non-Summit.

== Biography ==
=== Early life ===
In 2008, Takuya took part in the 21st Junon Superboy Contest. After making it through to the finals, Takuya was awarded the Special Jury Prize. Takuya signed with Japanese Entertainment Label Amuse, Inc. and starred in a handful of Amuse productions including Japanese Drama SIGN and stage musical Black & White. In 2010, Takuya transferred to the Korean subsidiary branch 'Amuse Korea' to join Project A (later named Cross Gene), an all-male Asian pop group to be made up of members from the different East Asian countries.

=== 2012: K-Pop Debut ===
Takuya debuted as an idol with the boy group, Cross Gene, on June 7, 2012, as the leader and vocalist of the group. He is known as the "Gorgeous Gene". Takuya later participated in and promoted movie roles including Live Action movie Ai Ore! in which he played the supporting role Kiryuuin Ruii alongside Karam from K-pop group DGNA. Takuya debuted for a second time in Japan, this time as a Pop Idol as a member of Cross Gene on March 13, 2013, with the release of the groups first Japanese single Shooting Star. During Cross Gene's Cross U concert in Japan, Takuya advised that he had given up the leadership role in Cross Gene.

In early 2014 Takuya took part in filming Cross Gene's project movie ZEDD in which he played the role of XI. Following promoting with Cross Gene for their first Korean comeback, Takuya joined Korean variety TV Show Non-Summit on JTBC as the representative for Japan. Takuya was well received by Korean audiences and earned the nickname Mr Slender hands (섬섬옥수) for his attractive hands. With the shows sudden popularity Takuya also experienced an increase in popularity. In November, Takuya was MC on the Red Carpet of the Melon Music Awards. Takuya also starred in the Music Video for Starship Entertainment Collaboration Hyolyn x Jooyoung, Erase. On 5 December Takuya was awarded the International Exchange Daesang at the Korean Hallyu Awards in recognition of his commitment to contributing to and sharing of Korean culture through both his position as a member of Cross Gene and as a panellist on the Korean variety show Non-Summit. In 2015 Takuya appeared in Mnet drama The Lover as "Takuya". He has appeared in movies and dramas in Japan, but he made his first acting debut in Korea with this drama.

In 2017, Takuya was selected as the torch relayer of the 2018 PyeongChang Winter Olympic Games and ran in the Masan District located in Changwon as the 57th torchbearer on November 14. On December 10, 2018, Takuya announced his departure from Cross Gene following the expiration of his contract with Amuse Korea. He subsequently signed with a new label.

In March 2023, he was appointed as the Visit Ibaraki Ambassador to Korea for his hometown, Ibaraki Prefecture, Japan.

== Filmography ==
=== Film ===
Year	Title	Role	Ref.
2012	Ai Ore!	Rui Kiryuuin	
2012	RUN60—Game Over—	Takao Kusuno	
2014	ZEDD	Xi	
2016	Zen'in Kataomoi: Kataomoi Spiral	Hajime	
2022	Grandpa (Short film)	Natsuo	
2023	Toxic Parents (Indie film)	Ahn Chang-hyun	
2024	The Daechi Scandal	Michio	

=== Television series ===
Year	Title	Role	Ref.
2011	SIGN	Tobi Ibaraki	
2012	RUN60	Takao Kusuno	
2015	The Lover	Takuya	

=== Web series ===
Year	Title	Role	Notes	Ref.
2018	By Chance	Takeshi Aida	Rakuten TV/iQiyi/Naver TV	
2022	The Scent of Trees	Takuya	Mocumentary	
2026	A Whirlwind Proposal (怒涛のプロポーズ)	Hidetoshi Kujo	Vigloo	
2026	The Lie We Lived In	Kentaro	Rakuten Viki	

=== Theatre and Musical ===
Year	Title	Role	Ref.
2010	Black & White	Angel	
2016	Black Butler: Noah's Ark Circus	Agni	
2017	Altar Boyz	Abraham	
2018	My host chan REBORN ~ Sorcery! Osaka Minami edition ~	Ayaka	
2018	Altar Boyz	Abraham	

=== Television shows ===
Year	Title	Role	Notes	Ref.
2014-2015	Non-Summit	Regular Cast	Episode 1-52	
2015	Match Made in Heaven Returns	Cast	Episode 1-3	
2015	Where Is My Friend's Home	Cast	7th (Australia) &10th trip (New Zealand)	
2015	Conte and the City	Cameo	Episode 3	
2016	Summoners War: Conquerors	Regular Cast	Season 1, 2	
2017	Yang Sechan's 10	Host	Season 2 Hosted along with Yang Se-chan and Shin Won-ho	
2017	JJ Nomad	Host	Episode 25	
2018	Takuya's Tokyo Express	Host	Episode 1 - 5	
2019	King of Mask Singer	Cast	Episode 207	
2019	Daehan Foreigner	Cast	Episode 35, 38	
2020	Isolated Paradise	Cast	Episode 5	
2021	Hallyu Ike-kup	Cast Member	with Kim Jae-joong	
2022	Any Body Can Dance	Regular Cast	Episode 1 - Series finale	
2022-2026	Talkpawon	Regular Cast	Episode 1 - 214	
2026	Mr. House Husband Season 2	Regular Cast	Episode 424-	

=== Web shows ===
Year	Title	Role	Ref.
2021	Jjinhan Namja	Cast member	

== Awards and nominations ==
=== JUNON Superboy Contest ===
Bout	Year	Nominated work	Category	Result
21st	2008	—N/a	Special Jury Prize	Won

=== Korean Hallyu Awards ===
Bout	Year	Nominated work	Category	Result
4th	2014	Non-Summit	International Exchange Daesang	Won
