= Real Life Men and Women =

South Korean television show

- Hangul: 현실남녀
- Hanja: 現實男女
- RR: Hyeonsillamnyeo
- MR: Hyŏnsillamnyŏ
- Genre: Reality show Lifestyle show
- Starring: Shin Sung-woo; Yoon Jung-soo; Yang Se-hyung; Choi Jong-hoon; Han Eun-jung; Gong Hyun-joo; Sunny; Chungha; Leeteuk; Seo Eunkwang; Jang Do-yeon
- Country of origin: South Korea
- Original language: Korean
- No. of seasons: 2
- No. of episodes: 22

Production
- Production location: South Korea
- Running time: 75 Minutes

Original release
- Network: MBN
- Release: January 11 – November 23, 2018

Real Life Men and Women (Korean: 현실남녀) is a South Korea variety talk show program aired on MBN, with Shin Sung-woo, Yoon Jung-soo, Yang Se-hyung, Choi Jong-hoon, Han Eun-jung, Gong Hyun-joo, Sunny, and Chungha as the main cast for season 1. Leeteuk, Seo Eunkwang and Jang Do-yeon were added to season 2 to replace Shin Sung-woo, Choi Jong-hoon and Gong Hyun-joo.

== Synopsis ==
It is a program that observes men and women's reaction and action in a real situation. The entertainers will reveal their real lives. They will try to see the difference and similarities between women and men.

== Cast ==
=== Season 1 ===
- Shin Sung-woo
- Yoon Jung-soo
- Yang Se-hyung
- Choi Jong-hoon
- Han Eun-jung
- Gong Hyun-joo
- Sunny
- Chungha

=== Season 2 ===
- Yoon Jung-soo
- Yang Se-hyung
- Leeteuk
- Seo Eunkwang
- Han Eun-jung
- Jang Do-yeon
- Sunny
- Chungha

== Episodes ==
=== Season 1 ===
Episode	Date	Topic
1	January 11, 2018	Earthquake survival
2	January 18, 2018	Driving
3	January 25, 2018	Blind Date
4	February 1, 2018	Date
5	February 8, 2018	Cooking
6	February 15, 2018	Babysit

=== Season 2 ===
Episode	Date	Topic
1	August 10, 2018	Drinking
2	August 17, 2018	Drinking
3	August 24, 2018	Stress
4	August 31, 2018	Stress
5	September 7, 2018	Friendship
6	September 14, 2018	Expenses
7	September 21, 2018	Troubles
8	September 28, 2018	Health
9	October 5, 2018	Challenges
10	October 12, 2018	Pretty Boys
11	October 19, 2018	Life
12	October 26, 2018	Gifts
13	November 2, 2018	—N/a
14	November 9, 2018	Finance
15	November 16, 2018	Trend
16	November 23, 2018	Entrepreneurship
