= Bachelor's Vegetable Store =

South Korean television series

- Promotional poster
- Genre: Melodrama; Comedy; Romance
- Based on: Bachelor's Vegetable Store by Kim Young-han and Lee Young-seok
- Written by: Yoon Sung-hee
- Directed by: Lee Joon-hyung
- Starring: Ji Chang-wook; Wang Ji-hye; Kim Young-kwang; Park Soo-jin; Hwang Shin-hye
- Music by: Lee Pil-ho
- Country of origin: South Korea
- Original language: Korean
- No. of episodes: 24

Production
- Executive producers: Cho Sung-won; Park In-taek
- Producer: Song Byung-soo
- Production location: Korea
- Production company: Touch Sky Production

Original release
- Network: Channel A
- Release: December 21, 2011 – March 8, 2012

Bachelor's Vegetable Store (Korean: 총각네 야채가게; RR: Chonggangne yachaegage) is a 2011 South Korean television series starring Ji Chang-wook, Wang Ji-hye, Kim Young-kwang, Park Soo-jin and Hwang Shin-hye. It aired on Channel A from December 21, 2011 to March 8, 2012 on Wednesdays and Thursdays at 21:20 (KST) for 24 episodes.

It is based on the same-titled book published in 2003 that chronicles the real-life success story of how a young man named Lee Young-seok turned a small 350-square-feet vegetable store in 1998 into a nationwide franchise with 33 branches.

== Synopsis ==
Han Tae-yang (Ji Chang-wook) is a hardworking, talented young man who will do anything to make his tiny vegetable stand a success. He hires a couple of "lost boys" who become his employees and friends: Nam Yoo-bong (Lee Kwang-soo), a successful yet lonely farmer with zero love life; Lee Chan-sol (Shin Won-ho), an idol trainee whose talent agency throws him out after nine years due to a hushed scandal, so he ends up working in a host club; Yoon Ho-jae (Song Ji-hyuk), a certifiable genius with a lack of social skills that makes him unhireable to big companies; and Jung Ki-young (Noh Sung-ha), a homeless man who doesn't talk much.

Tae-yang also falls in love with Mok Ga-on (Wang Ji-hye), but she is hiding a huge secret. She is actually Jin Jin-shim, an orphaned girl and Tae-yang‘a childhood best friend/first love. When her friend, the real Mok Ga-on, died when they were teenagers, Ga-on's ambitious mother Choi Kang-sun took Jin-shim in and told her to pretend to be her daughter, since Ga-on is the illegitimate daughter of a chaebol businessman. Desperate for a family, Jin-shim agreed, and now named Ga-on, she has a devoted but toxic relationship with Kang-sun. Ga-on also has feelings for Tae-yang, but she is torn between him and a wealthy heir, Lee Seul-woo (Kim Young-kwang).

== Cast ==
=== Main ===
- Ji Chang-wook as Han Tae-yang
  - Oh Jae-moo as young Tae-yang
- Wang Ji-hye as Mok Ga-on / Jin Jin-shim
  - Chae Bin as young Jin-shim
  - Park So-young as young Ga-on
- Kim Young-kwang as Lee Seul-woo
- Park Soo-jin as Jung Dan-bi

=== Supporting ===
- Hwang Shin-hye as Choi Kang-sun
- Lee Se-young as Han Tae-in
  - Roh Jeong-eui as young Tae-in
- Park Won-sook as Hwang Soo-ja
- Jang Hang-sun as Jung Goo-gwang
- Kim Do-yeon as Yeon Boon-hong
- Jeon No-min as Mok In-beom
- Lee Kwang-soo as Nam Yoo-bong
- Shin Won-ho as Lee Chan-sol
- Song Ji-hyuk as Yoon Ho-jae
- Noh Sung-ha as Jung Ki-young
- Lee Eun as Hong Jung-ah
- Sa Mi-ja as Park Geum-soon
- ?? as driver of Ga-on's mom
