= Jung Hye-sun =

South Korean actress (born 1942)

- Born: Jung Young-ja; February 21, 1942 (age 84); Seoul, South Korea
- Education: Sudo Girls' High School
- Occupation: Actress
- Years active: 1961–present

Korean name
- Hangul: 정영자
- RR: Jeong Yeongja
- MR: Chŏng Yŏngja

Stage name
- Hangul: 정혜선
- RR: Jeong Hyeseon
- MR: Chŏng Hyesŏn

Jung Hye-sun (Korean: 정혜선; born February 21, 1942), birth name Jung Young-ja (정영자), is a South Korean actress. Jung made her entertainment debut as a voice actress with the KBS Daejeon Radio in 1960, then began acting onscreen through the first KBS public audition in 1961. She has been active in Korean film, television and theater for more than five decades.

== Filmography ==
=== Film ===
Year	Title	Role
1968	The Third Zone	
1968	I'm Not a Traitor	
1969	The Third Zone	
1970	Five Left-handers	
1970	How Can I Forget?	
1970	Two Bigshots with a Grudge	
1970	Man and Woman from Hong Kong	
1970	Madame Jang from Hong Kong	
1970	One-Eyed Jack in Hong Kong	
1970	Nobody Knows	
1970	Born in Nampo-dong	
1970	Myeongdong Fella, Nampodong Fella	
1970	Old Gentleman in Myeongdong	
1971	Two Guys	
1971	The Graduation from Myeongdong	
1972	Ever Smiling Mr. Park	
1972	Don't Cry My Daughter	
1973	Love and Hatred	
1974	A Horrible Breath	
1974	Excellent Guys	
1974	A White Handkerchief	
1975	Sad San Francisco	
1975	Where Is the Light?	
1975	Chun-ja's Love Story	
1976	An Extinguished Window	
1976	Forgiven Woman	
1977	Pyongyang's Secret Order	
1977	The Double Rainbow Hill	
1979	We Took the Night Train	
1979	The Trappings of Youth	
1979	The Woman Who Draws Cranes	
1980	Thoughtless Momo	
1980	The Last Secret Affair	
1980	Painful Maturity	
1982	Night of the Shaman	
1982	Mistress	
1986	Jung-gwang's Nonsense	
1987	Forget-me-nots	
1987	Prince Yeonsan	Queen Insoo
1987	Five People	
1988	You My Rose Mellow	
1988	The Salt Vendor	
1988	Kkam-dong	Mother-in-law
1988	Dol-ai 4 Dune Buggy	
1988	Sunshine at Present	Lady Na
1988	Sexual Compatibility	
1989	Today's Woman	
1989	Happiness Does Not Come in Grades	Eun-joo's mother
1989	25 Dollar People	
1990	Broken Children	Nam-chul's mother
1990	The Woman Who Walks on Water	
1990	Hong Du-kae	Lady Jung
1991	The Wedding Dress of Tears	Director
1991	Does the American Moon Rise Over Itaewon?	
1991	Seoul Evita	
1995	Dustbin (short film)	
1995	The Marine Revelation	
1996	Ghost Mamma	Mother-in-law
2006	Solace	Shim In-ku's mother
2007	Sorrow Even Up in Heaven	Principal
2008	Barbershop (short film)	
2009	Goodbye Mom	Female monk
2009	Fly, Penguin	Mrs. Song
2011	Countdown	Money lender granny (cameo)

=== Television series ===
Year	Title	Role
1961	When the Day Comes	
1968	The Third Zone	
1970	Season of Love and Hate	
1970	Blossoming Ajumma	
1972	Stepmother	
1975	Reed	
1976	The Adventures of Chul-yi	
1978	I Sell Happiness	
1978	Trap of Youth	
1979	113th Investigative Division: "Two Sons of the North and South"	
1980	Daughter	
1981	1st Republic	Im Young-shin
1981	Angry Eyes	
1981	Nocturne	
1981	New Mistress	
1981	Madam Gyo-dong	
1982	Cannot Forget	
1982	Friend, Hey Friend	
1983	Kan-nan-yi	Grandmother
1983	I'm Home	
1984	500 Years of Joseon: "The Ume Tree in the Midst of the Snow"	Queen Jeonghui
1984	Missing You	
1984	Spray	
1985	That's Right, You Bet	
1985	Mom's Room	
1985	500 Years of Joseon: "The Imjin War"	
1987	Love and Ambition	Hye-young
1987	Retired Front	
1988	500 Years of Joseon: "Queen Inhyeon"	Queen Jangnyeol
1988	Famine in the City	Im Bok-seol
1989	A Happy Woman	Jae-seob's mother
1989	Mandate of Heaven	
1990	A House with the Deep Yard	
1990	The Rose of Betrayal	Mrs. Han
1990	My Mother	Mother
1990	Still 49	Jung Hye-kyung
1991	The Royal Way	
1991	Beyond the Mountains	Mrs. Song
1992	Promise	
1992	Thorn Flower	
1992	Sons and Daughters	Lee Hoo-nam's mother
1992	Fearless Love	Jung Hee-ja
1992	String	Song Bong-nim
1994	Kareisky	
1995	Even If the Wind Blows	Hairy ajumma
1995	Hopefully the Sky	
1996	General Oh	Jang Gil-ja
1996	Widow	
1996	Seven Spoons	
1996	Woman Riding a Bicycle	Lee Ae-ja
1997	Golden Feather	
1997	Because I Really	Hong Eun-pyo's mother
1997	Will Make You Happy	Grandmother
1997	Woman Next Door	
1998	Homecoming, a Short Story	
1998	The King's Path	Yeong-bin Lee
1998	Letters Written on a Cloudy Day	
1998	Mom's Daughter	Mom
1999	Invitation	Mrs. Min
1999	Someone's House	
1999	Hur Jun	Heo Jun's mother Ms. Son
2000	More than Love	Son Mal-sook
2000	Fireworks	Kim Ji-hyun's mother
2001	Morning Without Parting	Lee Soon-joo
2001	Blue Mist	Noh Kyung-joo's mother
2001	The Rules of Marriage	
2001	Third Coincidence	Song Yeon-hye's grandmother
2001	KBS TV Novel: "Stepmother"	Grandmother Yoon
2001	Picnic	Jung-ok
2002	Who's My Love	Kim Deok-ja
2003	Forever Love	Kim Jae-seob's mother
2003	Near to You	Ms. Kang
2003	Escape from Unemployment	Kim Ki-soon
2003	Perfect Love	Ha Young-ae's mother
2004	Proposal	Mrs. Oh
2004	Lotus Flower Fairy	Noh Bang-rim
2004	The Age of Heroes	Chun Tae-san's grandmother
2004	Freezing Point	Im Kyung-choon
2004	Tropical Nights in December	Choi Kkeut-soon
2005	Green Rose	Han Myung-sook
2005	Loveholic	Jo In-ja
2005	Recipe of Love	Kim Nan-hee
2005	Dear Heaven	Hwang Maria
2006	Love Can't Wait	Kang Soon-ja
2006	My Beloved Sister	Ji-na's grandmother
2007	By My Side	Bae Jung-ja
2007	Blue Fish	Kang Yoon-jung's mother
2007	Golden Bride	Heo Bok-rye
2008	Aquarius	Mrs. Jo
2008	Chunja's Special Day	Cha Bok-shim
2009	Cinderella Man	Company president Kang Ju-ok
2009	Green Coach	Oh Hyun-sook
2009	Queen Seondeok	Lady Man-ho
2009	Assorted Gems	Baek Jo
2009	Father, Your Place	Han Mal-soon
2009	Father's House	
2010	Golden Fish	Mrs. Kang
2010	Bread, Love and Dreams	Madam Hong
2010	Home Sweet Home	Park Dool-nam
2011	I Trusted Men	Moon Jin-heon's mother
2011	My Love By My Side	Mrs. Kang
2011	Glory Jane	Oh Soon-nyeo
2012	Feast of the Gods	Elder Seon
2012	Ice Adonis	Jo Myung-rye
2012	Dr. Jin	Queen Dowager Hyoyu
2012	My Lover, Madame Butterfly	Namgoong maknae
2013	A Hundred Year Legacy	Kim Kkeut-soon
2013	Pots of Gold	Park Hyun-soo's grandmother
2013	A Tale of Two Sisters	Shim Ae-gi
2014	God's Gift: 14 Days	Lee Soon-nyeo
2014	Only Love	Woo Jeom-soon
2014	Temptation	Im Jung-soon
2014	Apgujeong Midnight Sun	Ok Dan-shil
2014	4 Legendary Witches	Bok Dan-shim
2016	Goodbye Mr. Black	Jeong Hyun-sook
2016	Beautiful Gong Shim	Nam Soon Chun
2017	You Are Too Much	Sung Kyung-ja
2018	Hide and Seek	Na Hae-geum
2022–2023	Bean Pods in My Eyes	

== Theater ==
Year	Title	Role
	Hamlet	
	Bun-rye's Story	
	The Sound of Music	
	The Glass Menagerie	
2010	Please Look After Mom	Park So-nyo
2010	An Jung-geun, a Great Korean	Jo Maria

== Accolades ==
=== Awards and nominations ===
Year	Award	Category	Nominated work	Result
1973	1st Korea Broadcasting Awards	Top Excellence Award, Actress	Stepmother	Won
1975	11th Baeksang Arts Awards	Best Actress (TV)	Reed	Won
1975	MBC Drama Awards	Top Excellence Award, Actress	Reed	Won
1979	15th Baeksang Arts Awards	Best Actress (TV)	I Sell Happiness	Won
1979	MBC Drama Awards	Best Actress	Two Sons of the North and South	Won
1983	MBC Drama Awards	Grand Prize (Daesang)	Kan-nan-yi	Won
1984	3rd JoongAng Weekly Our Star Awards	Best Actress	Kan-nan-yi	Won
1984	20th Baeksang Arts Awards	Best Actress (TV)	Kan-nan-yi	Won
1993	29th Baeksang Arts Awards	Most Popular Actress (TV)	Fearless Love	Won
1994	30th Baeksang Arts Awards	Best Actress (TV)	Sons and Daughters	Won
2007	5th Korean Environment and Culture Awards	Recipient, Performer category	—N/a	Won
2009	MBC Drama Awards	Golden Acting Award, Actress in a Serial Drama	Assorted Gems	Won
2010	MBC Drama Awards	Achievement Award	Home Sweet Home	Won
2014	MBC Drama Awards	Golden Acting Award, Actress	4 Legendary Witches	Nominated
2014	SBS Drama Awards	Special Award, Actress in a Miniseries	God's Gift: 14 Days	Nominated
2022	1st Wonju Film Festival	Korean Film Achievement Award	—N/a	Won

=== State honors ===
Name of country, year given, and name of honor
Country	Award ceremony	Year	Honor	Ref.
South Korea	Korean Popular Culture and Arts Awards (Note: Honors are given at the Korean Popular Culture and Arts Awards, arranged by the Korea Creative Content Agency and hosted by the Ministry of Culture, Sports and Tourism. They are awarded to those who have contributed to the arts and South Korea's pop culture.)	2010	Prime Minister's Commendation	
South Korea	Korean Popular Culture and Arts Awards	2023	Eungwan Cultural	
