= The Legend of the Blue Sea =

2016 South Korean television series

- Promotional poster
- Hangul: 푸른 바다의 전설
- RR: Pureun badaui jeonseol
- MR: P'urŭn padaŭi chŏnsŏl
- Genre: Fantasy; Romance; Comedy
- Based on: Eou yadam by Yu Mong-in
- Developed by: Park Young-soo (SBS Drama)
- Written by: Park Ji-eun
- Directed by: Jin Hyuk; Park Seon-ho
- Starring: Jun Ji-hyun; Lee Min-ho
- Composer: Ryo Yoshimata
- Country of origin: South Korea
- Original language: Korean
- No. of episodes: 20 + 1 special

Production
- Executive producers: Kim Sun-jung; Choi Jin-hee; Lee Ji-hyun
- Production locations: Goesan, North Chungcheong Province, Jeju Province, South Korea; Palau; Girona, Catalonia, Spain; A Coruña, Galicia, Spain
- Cinematography: Choi Sang-muk
- Editor: Lee Hyun-mi
- Running time: 70 minutes
- Production companies: Culture Depot; Studio Dragon
- Budget: US$19 million

Original release
- Network: SBS TV
- Release: November 16, 2016 – January 25, 2017

The Legend of the Blue Sea (Korean: 푸른 바다의 전설) is a 2016–2017 South Korean television series starring Jun Ji-hyun and Lee Min-ho. Inspired by a classic Joseon legend from Korea's first collection of unofficial historical tales about a fisherman who captures and releases a mermaid, this drama tells the love story of a con-artist and a mermaid who travels across the ocean to find him.

The series aired on SBS from November 16, 2016, to January 25, 2017, every Wednesday and Thursday at 22:00 (KST). The series achieved a peak audience ratings of 21.0%.

== Synopsis ==
The series centres on the love story of Shim Cheong (Jun Ji-hyun), a mermaid, and Heo Joon-jae (Lee Min-ho), a witty con-artist. Focusing on rebirth, fate, and unrequited love, their tale is juxtaposed with the parallel story of their Joseon-era incarnations, the mermaid, Se-hwa, and town head, Kim Dam-ryeong.

=== Dam-ryeong and Se-hwa ===
During the Joseon era, a mermaid saves the son of a nobleman, Kim Dam-ryeong, from drowning. Following the incident, the two children become close friends, and Dam-ryeong names her Se-hwa, meaning 'a bright, shining child', after his deceased younger sister. Despite being from two different worlds, they fall in love until Dam-ryeong is forced to take up an arranged marriage. Se-hwa plans to live upon the land with Dam-ryeong, but she cannot turn her fishtail into a pair of human legs yet due to having not reached adulthood. Devastated by the news of Dam-ryeong's marriage, she decides to leave him forever. Nevertheless, Dam-ryeong's love for Se-hwa forces him to leave his wife on their wedding night and jump into the ocean to look for her. A distraught Se-hwa rescues him from drowning and promptly erases his memories of her and their love so that he may not look for her again.

After years of separation, their paths cross again when they are adults as Se-hwa is found by town folks trapped in a cave after a storm, and brought before Dam-ryeong, now a widowed town official. While Dam-ryeong does not remember Se-hwa, he takes pity on her and sets her free. This angers the town inn head, nobleman Yang Seung-gil, who had plans of exploiting Se-hwa for his monetary desires. Yang plots to overthrow Dam-ryeong, with the help of his materialistic concubine, Hong Nan, as he murders those in his way and spreads a rumour that Dam-ryeong is unfit to rule as he is bewitched by a wicked mermaid, allowing him to capture Se-hwa as the village falls into panic. Dam-ryeong rescues Se-hwa, tortured by Yang and his concubine to extract her tears, which turn into rare sea pearls. Yang and his concubine are arrested, while Dam-ryeong returns Se-hwa to the sea so that she can recuperate.

Dam-ryeong, who has been experiencing dreams of himself, Se-hwa, and their foes in the future, fear that the same ill-fate that afflicts himself and Se-hwa will replay itself. To warn his future self, he commissions a time capsule containing a portrait of himself with a message to his future self that "everything is repeating itself" and he has to protect the reincarnation of Se-hwa from danger, mainly due to the reincarnations of Yang and anyone related to him.

A furious Dam-ryeong is determined to kill Yang and expose all his crimes until he is exiled and removed from his position by the court due to the rumours. While Dam-ryeong is being escorted on a boat for his exile, Yang and his associates renew their search for Se-hwa by setting a trap using lanterns, and she is lured up to the surface, thinking it is Dam-ryeong's signal. Se-hwa comes under attack by nets, arrows, and harpoons from Yang's men. Urged by his suspicions after noticing the floating lanterns from afar, Dam-ryeong requests for the boat to turn around, and a fight ensues between the guards and Yang's men. Dam-ryeong plunges into the water just as a harpoon, hurled by Yang's son, impales him from behind, saving Se-hwa. As Dam-ryeong dies in her arms, Se-hwa thrusts the harpoon deeper through his body and stabs herself. The boats sink, carrying Dam-ryeong's belongings with them, and Dam-ryeong's jadeite bracelet, which he gifted Se-hwa earlier, slides off from Se-hwa's hand as she dies and is lost to the ocean.

Yang and his concubine are executed for their crimes after the surviving officials clear Dam-ryeong of the false accusations. It turns out that Yang had extorted and poisoned a merchant; the merchant's son Park Moo avenges his father and Dam-ryeong.

=== Joon-jae and Shim Cheong ===
In the modern-day, young Heo Joon-jae runs away from home after his parents' divorce and his father obtaining the rights to raise him. His father, Heo Il-joong (Choi Jung-woo), adopts stepson Chi-hyun (Lee Ji-hoon) after his marriage with Kang Seo-hee (Hwang Shin-hye). Joon-jae's mother, Mo Yoo-ran (Na Young-hee), after the divorce, works as a housekeeper after running out of money following the divorce. During his search for his mother, Joon-jae becomes a con-artist, using his good looks, wits, and skills in hypnotism in conducting scams with his mentor, Jo Nam-doo (Lee Hee-joon), and computer hacking genius, Tae-oh (Shin Won-ho). His affections are chased after by his college classmate, Cha Shi-ah (Shin Hye-sun).

Using the money earned from his scams, Joon-jae flies to Spain for a vacation. There he meets a mysterious woman with an unusual demeanour who breaks into his hotel room. He calls the police, who take her as a suspect for recent thefts in the local area, but Joon-jae retrieves her after being curious about the jadeite bracelet he saw on the woman's arm. Nam-doo receives a photo of the woman with the jadeite from Joon-jae and confirms over the phone that the jadeite is genuine and of unimaginably high price due to its quality. Meanwhile, Joon-jae is chased by gunmen hired by a rich businesswoman who had fallen for Joon-jae's scams. He brings the mysterious woman with him throughout the pursuit until they end up cornered on a cliff facing the sea. They jump into the water, and the woman revealed to be a mermaid unbeknownst to Joon-jae, kisses him to erase his memories of her but promises to follow him to Seoul.

Joon-jae returns to Seoul and is tormented by the gaps in his memories and Jo Nam-doo's claims of him being with a girl with expensive jadeite. After three months of travelling, the mermaid also arrives in Seoul, wandering around the city for days until she runs into Joon-jae. He recognises her to be the woman Nam-doo refers to from the pictures he sent to Nam-doo and interrogates her on her identity and why he cannot remember her, although she hesitates to answer. He brings her to his home and names her Shim Cheong. He allows her to stay at his home for several days to recollect and sort out his memories of her but makes her leave as she is reluctant to help him remember anything significant. That evening, she accidentally gets hit by Chi-hyun's car, after which Joon-jae decides to take her back to his house. After this, they steadily grow close to each other.

Linked by dreams, mysterious artefacts, including the jadeite bracelet, a vase with an image of a mermaid kissing a man in modern-day clothes, and the portrait of Kim Dam-ryeong with the inscription "everything is repeating itself", Joon-jae learns of Dam-ryeong's world and his fate, concluding that he and Shim Cheong are reincarnations of Kim Dam-ryeong and Se-hwa. Through his consultations with Professor of Neuropsychiatry Jin Kyung-won (Lee Ho-jae), he can retrieve his lost memories and the entire rendering of his dreams about Kim Dam-ryeong and Se-hwa. He can also hear Shim Cheong's inner voice; he learns that she is indeed a mermaid and that, unless she returns to the ocean, her heart will harden and eventually stop if he will not love her.

Kang Seo-hee, Joon-jae's step-mother, hires the fugitive, Ma Dae-young (Sung Dong-il), to kill Joon-jae as a part of her scheme to inherit Heo Il-joong's fortune. She also has secretly introduced Heo Il-joong with small yet potent doses of anticholinergic and monkshood extract, contributing to his failing health, particularly his vision. Chi-hyun dutifully nurses him, completely unaware of his mother's betrayal. Ma Dae-young attempts several times to murder both Joon-jae and Shim Cheong but fails. During an attempt to murder her, Ma Dae-young is surprised by Shim Cheong, after which she erases Ma Dae-young's memories and, in the process, she also learns the fate of their Joseon era incarnations Kim Dam-ryeong and Se-hwa.

Joon-jae and Shim Cheong live comfortably with each other despite conflicts and the fear of the impending ill-fate. Thanks to Shim Cheong, Joon-jae also reunites with his mother, Mo Yoo-ran, who quit her job as a housekeeper. On the other hand, Chi-hyun learns that his birth father is Ma Dae-young, Kang Seo-hee's longtime partner. He also learns of Kang Seo-hee's crimes and reluctantly consents to them. Kang Seo-hee finally kills Heo Il-joong, using a solid dose of monkshood as she becomes aware of Heo Il-joong's suspicions. Joon-jae, with the help of Shim Cheong, Jo Nam-doo, Tae-oh, and police officer-detective Hong Dong-pyo (Park Hae-soo), busts Kang Seo-hee, revealing her real name to be "Kang Ji-yeon" and her schemes. A maddened Chi-hyun grabs a police officer's gun as he's being arrested and shoots at Joon-jae, but Shim Cheong takes the shot to save him. Kang Seo-hee and Chi-hyun are both arrested, and while in custody, Chi-hyun commits suicide by monkshood poison. Shim Cheong, being a mermaid, survives the fatal injury and makes a miraculous recovery that astonishes hospital staff.

Joon-jae learns that Ma Dae-young is visiting Professor Jin Kyung-won. As Joon-jae, Jo Nam-doo, and Officer Hong Dong-pyo rush to get him, Ma Dae-young recovers his memories of his past life again and learns that the executions of his incarnation, Yang Seung-gil, and his concubine, Hong Nan, was carried out by the Park Moo, Jo Nam-doo's incarnation. Just as Professor Jin Kyung-won was about to be murdered, Joon-jae arrives with the police who arrest Ma Dae-young.

Shim Cheong is discharged from the hospital afterwards. However, she is still in recurring pain since she was shot at her heart. After noticing Cheong's discomfort several times in the absence of a complete recovery, Joon-jae decides to let go of Cheong so that she can go back into the ocean to regain her health. Before leaving, Shim Cheong erases Joon-jae's memories of her as the uncertainty of her return is enormous, even after he disagrees with the idea, and later, of everyone who knew her, except that of her friend, Yoo-na (Shin Min-ah), an elementary school student who is the reincarnation of a daughter of a mermaid and human fisherman.

Three years later, Joon-jae becomes a prosecutor, Jo Nam-doo works as a lecturer, and Tae-oh, now working as a white hacker, is engaged to Cha Shi-ah. Shim Cheong fully recovers and returns to Seoul to meet Joon-jae. Despite his lost memories, Joon-jae recognises Shim Cheong, and it is revealed that he recorded his life with Shim Cheong, in case his memories are lost again. They move to a house near the sea, and Shim Cheong becomes pregnant. Joon-jae ultimately evades the ill fate that had been in store for them with Kim Dam-ryeong's visions.

== Cast ==
=== Main ===
- Jun Ji-hyun as Shim Cheong / Se-hwa
  - Kal So-won as child Se-hwa
  - Shin Eun-soo as teenage Se-hwa

A mermaid in the Joseon era who falls in love with Dam-ryeong as a child after saving him, and is named as Se-hwa by Dam-ryeong after his late sister. As they are initially unable to stay together due to his arranged marriage and Se-hwa's inability to turn her tail into legs without reaching adulthood yet, she erases his memories. The two meet again and suffer a tragic fate together, beginning the first omen that will tie their reincarnations.
In the modern day, she follows Joon-jae to Seoul after developing feelings for him in Spain. He names her Shim Cheong, which means "extremely stupid" (where Shim means "extreme" and Cheong is shortened from the Korean word for "stupid"), as she is highly ignorant about the common things on land. Coincidentally, it is also the name of a folklore character. Like her Joseon-era incarnation, she has super strength and the ability to read and erase one's memories.

- Lee Min-ho as Heo Joon-jae / Kim Dam-ryeong
  - Jeon Jin-seo as child Heo Joon-jae / Kim Dam-ryeong
  - Park Jin-young as teenage Heo Joon-jae / Kim Dam-ryeong

The town head and son of a magistrate in the Joseon era who falls in love with a mermaid as a child, and names her Se-hwa after his late sister. As he begins to dream about the tragic fate of their modern-day reincarnations, he commissions a time capsule to warn his future self.
Joon-jae, his future self, is a con-artist who uses wits and looks to conduct scams on people of the privileged class of the society. He meets Shim Cheong, a mermaid and ultimately falls in love with her, thus being able to read her thoughts. After conceiving dreams about their Joseon-era incarnations and receiving Dam-ryeong's time capsule, he sets out to change the ill-fate that chased Dam-ryeong and Se-hwa.

=== Supporting ===
- Lee Hee-joon as Jo Nam-doo / Park Moo

A con-artist and Joon-jae's mentor. He trains Joon-jae and turns him into a skilled con-artist. His Joseon incarnation is Park Moo, who worked with Yang's son. It is later revealed that his loyalty towards Dam-ryeong and Joon-jae prevails throughout, in both the Joseon era and modern day.

- Shin Hye-sun as Cha Shi-ah

Joon-jae's university junior who works as a researcher in conservational science, and has feelings for him. Through her job, she discovers Dam-ryeong's time capsule from the Joseon era and helps Joon-jae learn about Dam-ryeong. She is later revealed to be the deceased wife of Dam-ryeong in the Joseon era. She later develop a crush on Tae-oh.

- Shin Won-ho as Tae-oh

A genius hacker and a con-artist working with Joon-jae and Nam-doo. He was mentioned to be coming from Japan. He is a quiet person who likes to play computer games. He initially has a secret crush on Shim Cheong, but ends up falling for Cha Shi-ah.

- Lee Ji-hoon as Heo Chi-hyun

Joon-jae's stepbrother. He tries to be a dutiful son as he stays by his stepfather's side after Joon-jae left home but turns against Joon-jae and his stepfather eventually due to his unrequited love for his stepfather. His Joseon incarnation was Yang's son, who kills Dam-ryeong and Se-hwa by impaling them with a harpoon.

- Na Young-hee as Mo Yoo-ran
  - Shim Yi-young as young Mo Yoo-ran

Joon-jae's mother. She works as the Cha family's housekeeper.

- Hwang Shin-hye as Kang Seo-hee / Kang Ji-yeon
  - Oh Yeon-ah as young Kang Seo-hee / young Kang Ji-yeon / Hong Nan

Chi-hyun's mother and Joon-jae's stepmother. She and her twin sister used to live in an orphanage before they got adopted into different families; however, her adoptive father was abusive towards her while her twin lives with a rich family. She does anything to provide a luxurious life for her son. She dispatches Ma Dae-young to kill Joon-jae to make Chi-hyun the definite heir of Heo Il-joong's fortunes. Her real name, Kang Ji-yeon, is revealed in the later part of the series when the police discover that she inherited fortunes of her two former husbands following their mysterious deaths. She later murdered her twin sister, whose name is Kang Seo-hee, and assumes her identity and wealth. She was also revealed to have grown up in the same orphanage as Ma Dae-young, who was her partner and Chi-hyun's father. In the Joseon era, she is Hong Nan, Mr. Yang's concubine.

- Sung Dong-il as Ma Dae-young / Yang Seung-gil

A corrupt nobleman during the Joseon era who attempts to capture the mermaid. In the modern day, he is a murderer and fugitive who is dispatched by Ji-hyun to kill Joon-jae. He is later revealed to be Chi-hyun's father. Ji-hyun and Dae-young are partners since childhood.

- Choi Jung-woo as Heo Il-joong

Joon-jae's father, and a property agent. After the success of his business, he divorces Yoo-ran and marries Ji-hyun.

- Moon So-ri as Ahn Jin-joo

Shi-ah's sister-in-law, a Daechi-dong madam who is vain and haughty. In her past life, she is revealed to be Yoo-ran's servant.

=== Recurring ===
- Park Hae-soo as Hong Dong-pyo

A modern-day detective who is investigating Dae-young's crimes as well as Joon-jae's scams. Later, he sides with Joon-jae in investigating the death of Heo Il-joong by the hands of Ji-hyun. In Joseon era, he is a government official who is indebted to Dam-ryeong after the latter clears the former's father's name of false accusations

- Park Ji-il as Manager Nam
  - Choi Kwon as young Manager Nam

Il-joong's secretary and Joon-jae's friend in the present time. He takes care of young Joon-jae when he's lonely after his parents' divorce. In Joseon era, he is Dam-ryeong's loyal friend.

- Shin Rin-ah as Seo Yoo-na

Shim Cheong's young friend. Apart from Dam-ryeong / Joon-jae, she is the only one who can hear Se-hwa / Shim Cheong's inner voice during both the Joseon era and modern day. In the Joseon era, she was a daughter of a fisherman and a mermaid.

- Hong Jin-kyung as Shim Cheong's homeless friend

A beggar whom Shim Cheong always seeks when she has problems and needs life advice.

- Lee Jae-won as Cha Dong-shik

Shi-ah's brother and Jin-joo's husband.

- Lee Ho-jae as Professor Jin Kyung-won

A modern-day neuropsychiatrist who is also Joon-jae's professor in KAIST. He helps both Heo Joon-jae and Ma Dae-young recover the memories of their Joseon-era incarnations.

=== Special appearances ===
- Kim Sung-ryung as Jang Jin-ok, CEO of Myeongdong Capital (Ep. 1–3)
- Ko Kyu-pil as Lead Bodyguard of Myeongdong Capital (Ep. 1, 3)
- Krystal Jung as Min-ji, a flight attendant (Ep. 1)
- Ahn Jae-hong as Thomas, a missionary (Ep. 2)
- Kim Hye-yoon as Jang Jin-ok's daughter (Ep. 3)
- Cha Tae-hyun as a Han River con-man (Ep. 4)
- Kim Kang-hyun as a police officer (Ep. 5)
- Park Jin-joo as a nurse (Ep. 6)
- Jo Jung-suk as Yoo Jung-hoon (Ep. 7–8)

A merman working for the Han River coast guard. Initially shocked to encounter another of his kind in Seoul, he mentors Shim Cheong about survival on land. Jung-hoon loves a woman named Kim Hye-jin, but she left him after she discovered that he is a merman; as a result of Hye-jin stopped loving him, Jung-hoon dies after his heart stops beating.

- Jeong Yu-mi as Kim Hye-jin (Ep. 8)

A woman whom Jung-hoon loves, but she left him after discovering that he is a merman. She seems saddened and full of remorse upon receiving news of Jung-hoon's death.

- Kim Sun-young as a lady in the sauna (Ep. 11)
- Im Won-hee as a doctor (Ep. 19)
- Kim Seul-gi as a young mermaid that Shim Cheong gives advice to (Ep. 20)

== Production ==
Filming began on August 19, 2016 in Goesan, North Chungcheong Province, South Korea. The production team then flew to Palau to film underwater scenes. The cast and crew flew to Spain on September 11 where they filmed in A Coruña, Ribadeo, Lugo, Tossa de Mar and Castell de Santa Florentina in Canet de Mar, as well as Begur (Es Cau Swimming Pool), Sitges (Town Hall and other backdrops) and Barcelona (exteriors of Palau de la Música Catalana, etc.), among other places in Catalonia and Galicia (Spain). The first script reading was held on October 8, 2016, two months after production began, due to the busy schedules of the actors. It lasted three hours and covered the first four episodes.

This drama served as a reunion for Lee Min-ho and Kim Sung-ryung, who had son and mother relationship in the 2013 SBS hit drama across Asia, The Heirs, for Lee Ji-hoon and Shin Hye-sun who debuted together in the 2012 KBS2 hit school drama School 2013 as well as Jun Ji-hyun, Hong Jin-kyung, and Na Young-hee who previously worked together in the 2013 SBS hit drama My Love from the Star.

== Original soundtrack ==
The Legend of the Blue Sea Original Soundtrack

Soundtrack album by Various Artists
- Released: January 20, 2017 (digital); January 24, 2017 (2CD)
- Genre: Soundtrack
- Labels: Jellyfish; LOEN; L100005295
- Producer: Hwang Se-jun (executive)

Part 1

No.	Title	Lyrics	Music	Artist	Length
1.	"Love Story"	Kim Jang-woo; Kim Ji-hyang	Kim Ji-hyang; MELODESIGN	Lyn	3:24
2.	"Love Story" (Inst.)		Kim Ji-hyang; MELODESIGN		3:24
Total length:					6:48

Part 2

No.	Title	Lyrics	Music	Artist	Length
1.	"A World That Is You" (그대라는 세상)	Han Joo	Lee Yoo-jin	Yoon Mi-rae	3:37
2.	"A World That Is You" (그대라는 세상 (Inst.))		Lee Yoo-jin		3:37
Total length:					7:14

Part 3

No.	Title	Lyrics	Music	Artist	Length
1.	"Lean on You" (너에게 기울어가)	Kim Ji-hyang	MELODESIGN	Jung-yup (Brown Eyed Soul)	3:46
2.	"Lean on You" (너에게 기울어가 (Inst.))		MELODESIGN		3:46
Total length:					7:32

Part 4

No.	Title	Lyrics	Music	Artist	Length
1.	"Shy Boy" (설레이는 소년처럼)	Shin Hae-chul	Glory Face; Jo Yong-ho	Ha Hyun-woo (Guckkasten)	3:31
2.	"Shy Boy" (설레이는 소년처럼 (Inst.))		Glory Face; Jo Yong-ho		3:31
Total length:					7:02

Part 5

No.	Title	Lyrics	Music	Artist	Length
1.	"Somewhere Someday" (어디선가 언젠가)	Kim Eana	Sung Si-kyung; MELODESIGN	Sung Si-kyung	4:32
2.	"Somewhere Someday" (어디선가 언젠가 (Inst.))		Sung Si-kyung; MELODESIGN		4:32
Total length:					9:04

Part 6

No.	Title	Lyrics	Music	Artist	Length
1.	"Wind Flower" (바람꽃)	Hana; Tom & Jerry	Tom & Jerry	Lee Sun-hee	4:11
2.	"Wind Flower" (바람꽃 (Inst.))		Tom & Jerry		4:11
Total length:					8:22

Part 7

No.	Title	Lyrics	Music	Artist	Length
1.	"Fool" (바보야)	Honey Pot	Honey Pot	Ken (VIXX)	3:14
2.	"Fool" (바보야 (Inst.))		Honey Pot		3:14
Total length:					6:28

Part 8

No.	Title	Lyrics	Music	Artist	Length
1.	"Why Would I Do Like This" (내가 왜 이럴까)	Noh Ah-ram (Coffee Boy)	Noh Ah-ram	Coffee Boy	3:14
2.	"Why Would I Do Like This" (내가 왜 이럴까 (Inst.))		Noh Ah-ram		3:14
Total length:					6:28

Part 9

No.	Title	Lyrics	Music	Artist	Length
1.	"Day By Day" (하루에 하나씩)	ZigZag Note; Kang Myung-shin	ZigZag Note; Kang Myung-shin	Park Yoon-ha	3:09
2.	"Day By Day" (하루에 하나씩 (Inst.))		ZigZag Note; Kang Myung-shin		3:09
Total length:					6:18

Part 10

No.	Title	Lyrics	Music	Artist	Length
1.	"If Only" (만에 하나)	Min Yeon-jae; Lee Dae-sung (BIGTONE)	KingMing; Kim Dong-hwi	Se-jeong (Gugudan)	4:16
2.	"If Only" (만에 하나 (Inst.))		KingMing; Kim Dong-hwi		4:16
Total length:					8:32

Part 11

No.	Title	Lyrics	Music	Artist	Length
1.	"Love Road" (사랑길)	Kim Ji-hyang	MELODESIGN	Min Chae	3:54
2.	"Love Road" (사랑길 (Inst.))		MELODESIGN		3:54
Total length:					7:48

=== Instrumental ===
I.

No.	Title	Music	Artist	Length
1.	"Sound Of Ocean"	Ryo Yoshimata	Ryo Yoshimata
2.	"Memories"	Yoshimata	Yoshimata
3.	"The Last Time"	Yoshimata	Yoshimata
Total length:				8:21

II.

No.	Title	Lyrics	Music	Artist	Length
1.	"Hidden Story" (숨겨진 이야기)	Second Moon	Second Moon	Second Moon feat. Han Ah-reum
2.	"My Name" (나의 이름)		Second Moon	Second Moon feat. Han Ah-reum
3.	"The Way to Meet You" (너를 찾아 가는길)	Second Moon	Second Moon	Second Moon
4.	"At This Time" (다음 이시간에)	Second Moon	Second Moon	Second Moon
Total length:					9:45

=== Charted songs ===
Chart Performance

Title	Year	Peak chart positions	Sales	Remarks
Title	Year	KOR Gaon	Sales	Remarks
"Love Story" (Lyn)	2016	21	KOR: 181,202+	Part 1
"A World That Is You" (Yoon Mi-rae)	2016	10	KOR: 208,326+	Part 2
"Lean on You" (Jung-yup (Brown Eyed Soul))	2016	46	KOR: 89,521	Part 3
"Shy Boy" (Ha Hyun-woo (Guckkasten))	2016	64	KOR: 51,209	Part 4
"Somewhere Someday" (Sung Si-kyung)	2016	11	KOR: 274,787+	Part 5
"Wind Flower" (Lee Sun-hee)	2016	27	KOR: 167,441+	Part 6
"Fool" (Ken (VIXX))	2016	78	KOR: 44,708+	Part 7
"If Only" Se-jeong (Gugudan)	2017	35	KOR: 56,719+	Part 10

== Reception ==
The show started with a strong 16.4% viewership rating nationwide, reaching as high as 20.7% for certain scenes, according to Nielsen Korea and surpassed the 20% mark in the metropolitan area by its sixth episode. The series maintained the first-place ranking for its timeslot during its airing and surpassed 20% viewership ratings. The series also fared well overseas, having been exported to all major regions around the world, including Southeast Asia, the Americas and Europe. After the release of director's cut for the first two episodes which included additional scenes, it was acclaimed to be good and many felt that these episodes would've done much better than the previous cuts.

Jun's performance as a mermaid was met with overall high praise; with The Straits Times saying that she is "brilliant as the otherworldly goofball who is blissfully unaware of the mission to save her self-worth" and Yonhap News Agency highlighting her "trademark lanky, slender yet at times powerful and dramatic performance".

== Ratings ==
Average TV viewership ratings
Ep.	Original broadcast date	Average audience share			
Ep.	Original broadcast date	Nielsen Korea		TNmS	
Ep.	Original broadcast date	Nationwide	Seoul	Nationwide	Seoul
1	November 16, 2016	16.4% (4th)	18.0% (2nd)	15.4% (4th)	18.9% (3rd)
2	November 17, 2016	15.1% (4th)	16.4% (4th)	16.2% (4th)	20.1% (3rd)
3	November 23, 2016	15.7% (4th)	17.2% (4th)	18.6% (4th)	19.6% (2nd)
4	November 24, 2016	17.1% (4th)	18.4% (3rd)	17.9% (4th)	21.3% (3rd)
5	November 30, 2016	16.8% (3rd)	20.5% (1st)	16.4% (4th)	20.4% (2nd)
6	December 1, 2016	18.9% (2nd)	22.1% (1st)	18.1% (2nd)	20.2% (1st)
7	December 7, 2016	17.4% (2nd)	19.2% (1st)	15.8% (4th)	18.1% (2nd)
8	December 8, 2016	17.4% (2nd)	19.1% (2nd)	17.4% (3rd)	19.7% (1st)
9	December 14, 2016	16.6% (2nd)	18.8% (2nd)	14.8% (5th)	16.4% (2nd)
10	December 15, 2016	17.5% (2nd)	19.3% (2nd)	16.8% (4th)	19.2% (2nd)
11	December 21, 2016	16.7% (3rd)	18.1% (2nd)	17.7% (3rd)	20.1% (2nd)
12	December 22, 2016	17.3% (3rd)	18.7% (2nd)	16.3% (4th)	18.0% (2nd)
13	December 28, 2016	16.0% (4th)	17.2% (3rd)	15.8% (4th)	18.4% (2nd)
14	January 4, 2017	17.8% (3rd)	18.7% (2nd)	15.1% (4th)	18.1% (3rd)
15	January 5, 2017	18.3% (3rd)	20.1% (2nd)	15.9% (3rd)	19.4% (2nd)
16	January 11, 2017	18.9% (3rd)	20.7% (2nd)	15.1% (4th)	19.0% (2nd)
17	January 12, 2017	20.8% (2nd)	23.0% (2nd)	18.9% (3rd)	22.2% (2nd)
18	January 18, 2017	18.3% (3rd)	19.9% (2nd)	16.5% (3rd)	18.4% (2nd)
19	January 19, 2017	21.0% (2nd)	22.2% (2nd)	18.7% (3rd)	20.4% (2nd)
20	January 25, 2017	17.9% (3rd)	18.8% (2nd)	16.2% (4th)	18.4% (2nd)
Average		17.6%	19.3%	16.7%	19.3%
Special	December 29, 2016 (Note: SBS aired a movie-like special episode summarizing the first half of the drama focusing on the relationship between Shim Cheong and Heo Joon-jae.)	11.2% (7th)	12.3% (4th)	14.5% (8th)	13.3% (4th)
In the table above, the blue numbers represent the lowest ratings and the red numbers represent the highest ratings.

== Awards and nominations ==
Year	Award	Category	Recipient	Result
2016	24th SBS Drama Awards	Grand Prize (Daesang)	Jun Ji-hyun	Nominated
2016	24th SBS Drama Awards	Grand Prize (Daesang)	Lee Min-ho	Nominated
2016	24th SBS Drama Awards	Top Excellence Award, Actor in a Genre & Fantasy Drama	Lee Min-ho	Won
2016	24th SBS Drama Awards	Top Excellence Award, Actress in a Genre & Fantasy Drama	Jun Ji-hyun	Nominated
2016	24th SBS Drama Awards	Excellence Award, Actor in a Fantasy Drama	Lee Hee-joon	Nominated
2016	24th SBS Drama Awards	Excellence Award, Actress in a Fantasy Drama	Shin Hye-sun	Nominated
2016	24th SBS Drama Awards	Excellence Award, Actress in a Fantasy Drama	Hwang Shin-hye	Nominated
2016	24th SBS Drama Awards	Special Award, Actor in Fantasy Drama	Sung Dong-il	Won
2016	24th SBS Drama Awards	Special Award, Actor in Fantasy Drama	Lee Ji-hoon	Nominated
2016	24th SBS Drama Awards	Special Award, Actress in a Fantasy Drama	Oh Yeon-ah	Nominated
2016	24th SBS Drama Awards	K-Wave Star Award	Lee Min-ho	Nominated
2016	24th SBS Drama Awards	K-Wave Star Award	Jun Ji-hyun	Nominated
2016	24th SBS Drama Awards	Best Couple	Lee Min-ho and Jun Ji-hyun	Won
2016	24th SBS Drama Awards	Top 10 Stars	Lee Min-ho	Won
2016	24th SBS Drama Awards	Top 10 Stars	Jun Ji-hyun	Won
2016	24th SBS Drama Awards	Idol Academy Award – Best Eating (Mukbang)	Jun Ji-hyun	Won
2017	9th Melon Music Awards	Best OST	Sung Si-kyung (Somewhere Someday)	Nominated
