= Big (TV series) =

- Promotional poster
- Genre: Romance; Comedy; Drama; Fantasy
- Written by: Hong Jung-eun; Hong Mi-ran
- Directed by: Ji Byung-hyun; Kim Seong-yoon
- Starring: Gong Yoo; Lee Min-jung; Bae Suzy; Shin Won-ho
- Country of origin: South Korea
- Original language: Korean
- No. of episodes: 16

Production
- Production location: South Korea
- Running time: Mondays and Tuesdays at 21:55 (KST)
- Production company: Bon Factory Worldwide

Original release
- Network: KBS2
- Release: June 4 – July 24, 2012

Big (Korean: 빅) is a 2012 South Korean television series starring Gong Yoo and Lee Min-jung. The romantic comedy/body swap series aired on KBS2 from June 4 to July 24, 2012 on Mondays and Tuesdays at 21:55 for 16 episodes.

Written by the Hong sisters, Big was Gong Yoo's first television series after Coffee Prince in 2007 and since being discharged from mandatory military service. The drama was well-received although it was criticized for its ending.

== Synopsis ==
Gil Da-ran (Lee Min-jung) is a struggling substitute teacher trying to get her certificate. She is engaged to a kind and handsome doctor, Seo Yoon-jae (Gong Yoo); it is a fairy-tale-come-true until one month before the wedding, Yoon-jae inexplicably becomes distant. At the same time, Da-ran meets an 18-year-old transfer student from the United States, Kang Kyung-joon (Shin Won-ho), who's got an attitude towards everyone except Da-ran. Kyung-joon gets into a fateful car accident with Yoon-jae and the two of them drive over the guard rail and into the deep waters. Yoon-jae tries to save Kyung-joon but in the process, Yoon-jae ostensibly dies and Kyung-joon ends up in a coma. Kyung-joon soon wakes up finding himself in Yoon-jae's body.

== Cast ==
=== Main ===
- Gong Yoo as Kang Kyung-joon / Seo Yoon-jae
- Lee Min-jung as Gil Da-ran
- Bae Suzy as Jang Ma-ri
- Shin Won-ho as Kang Kyung-joon

=== Supporting ===
- Baek Sung-hyun as Gil Choong-shik, Da-ran's brother
- Jang Hee-jin as Lee Se-young
- Kim Seo-ra as Ahn Hye-jung, Yoon-jae's mother
- Ahn Suk-hwan as Gil Min-kyu, Da-ran's father
- Yoon Hae-young as Lee Jung-hye, Da-ran's mother
- Jo Young-jin as Seo In-wook, Yoon-jae's father
- Choi Ran as Kim Young-ok, vice principal
- Moon Ji-yoon as Na Hyo-sang, PE teacher
- Shin Ji-soo as Lee Ae-kyung, math teacher and Da-ran's friend
- Jang Hyun-sung as Kang Hyuk-soo, Kyung-joon's uncle
- Go Soo-hee as Lee Kyung-mi, Kyung-joon's aunt-in-law
- Im Ji-eun as Kang Hee-soo, Kyung-joon's mother
- Lee Hee-jin as the bride (cameo, episode 1)

== Production ==
=== Original soundtrack ===
Big: Original Sound Track

Soundtrack album by Various Artists
- Released: July 27, 2012
- Genres: Pop, K-pop, soundtrack, R&B, teen pop
- Labels: Bon Factory Worldwide, CJ E&M

CD 1:
No.	Title	Artist	Length
1.	"너라서" (Because It's You)	Davichi	4:16
2.	"사랑이라면" (If You Love)	Noel	3:46
3.	"한사람" (One Person)	Huh Gak	3:58
4.	"미운사람" (Hateful Person)	Beast	3:09
5.	"Hey U"	Venny	3:21
6.	"어떤날" (Some Days)	Venny	3:24
7.	"내가 좀 이상해" (I Feel So Weird)	Kim Ha-na	3:47
8.	"눈물이 또 나요" (Tears Fall Again)	Park Sang-joon	3:58
9.	"그래도 사랑해" (I Still Love You)	Suzy	4:45
10.	"너라서 (Special Track)" (Because It's You)	Gong Yoo	4:50

CD 2:
No.	Title	Artist	Length
1.	"너라서 (Inst.)" (Because It's You)	Various Artists	4:16
2.	"사랑이라면 (Inst.)" (If You Love)	Various Artists	3:46
3.	"한사람 (Inst.)" (One Person)	Various Artists	3:58
4.	"미운사람 (Inst.)" (Hateful Person)	Various Artists	3:09
5.	"Hey U (Inst.)"	Various Artists	3:21
6.	"어떤날 (Inst.)" (Some Days)	Various Artists	3:24
7.	"내가 좀 이상해 (Inst.)" (I Feel So Weird)	Various Artists	3:47
8.	"눈물이 또 나요 (Inst.)" (Tears Fall Again)	Various Artists	3:58
9.	"그래도 사랑해 (Inst.)" (I Still Love You)	Various Artists	4:45
10.	"너라서 (Special Track) (Inst.)" (Because It's You)	Various Artists	4:50

== Ratings ==
Ep.	Original broadcast date	Average audience share			
Ep.	Original broadcast date	TNmS		AGB Nielsen	
Ep.	Original broadcast date	Nationwide	Seoul	Nationwide	Seoul
1	4 June 2012	8.9%	10.4%	7.9%	8.9%
2	5 June 2012	8.0%	9.7%	7.4%	8.1%
3	11 June 2012	7.1%	8.4%	8.4%	9.4%
4	12 June 2012	7.6%	8.9%	7.9%	8.9%
5	18 June 2012	8.2%	10.1%	8.0%	9.3%
6	19 June 2012	8.9%	11.1%	8.3%	9.3%
7	25 June 2012	8.5%	9.7%	8.9%	10.4%
8	26 June 2012	7.8%	9.2%	7.9%	8.7%
9	2 July 2012	7.4%	7.8%	8.1%	9.1%
10	3 July 2012	8.8%	9.8%	8.1%	9.0%
11	9 July 2012	9.5%	10.5%	9.2%	10.4%
12	10 July 2012	9.6%	11.0%	8.9%	10.1%
13	16 July 2012	8.6%	9.2%	8.2%	9.7%
14	17 July 2012	8.6%	9.4%	7.8%	8.8%
15	23 July 2012	10.1%	10.2%	9.7%	10.8%
16	24 July 2012	11.5%	12.0%	11.1%	12.2%
Average		8.7%	9.8%	8.5%	9.5%

== Awards and nominations ==
Year	Award	Category	Recipient	Result
2012	5th Korea Drama Awards	Best OST	One Person – Huh Gak	Nominated
2012	4th MelOn Music Awards	Best OST	One Person – Huh Gak	Nominated
2012	14th Mnet Asian Music Awards	Best OST	One Person – Huh Gak	Nominated
2012	KBS Drama Awards	Excellence Award, Actor in a Miniseries	Gong Yoo	Nominated
2012	KBS Drama Awards	Excellence Award, Actress in a Miniseries	Lee Min-jung	Nominated
2012	KBS Drama Awards	Excellence Award, Actress in a Miniseries	Suzy	Nominated
2012	KBS Drama Awards	Best Couple Award	Gong Yoo & Lee Min-jung	Nominated
2012	KBS Drama Awards	Best Couple Award	Baek Sung-hyun & Suzy	Nominated
2012	KBS Drama Awards	Popularity Award	Suzy	Won
2013	8th Seoul International Drama Awards	Outstanding Korean Drama	Big	Nominated
2013	8th Seoul International Drama Awards	Outstanding Korean Actor	Gong Yoo	Nominated
2013	8th Seoul International Drama Awards	Outstanding Korean Actress	Lee Min-jung	Nominated
2013	8th Seoul International Drama Awards	Outstanding Korean Drama OST	Hateful Person – BEAST	Nominated
2013	8th Seoul International Drama Awards	Outstanding Korean Drama OST	One Person – Huh Gak	Nominated
