= Shin Won-ho =

Shin Won-ho 신원호
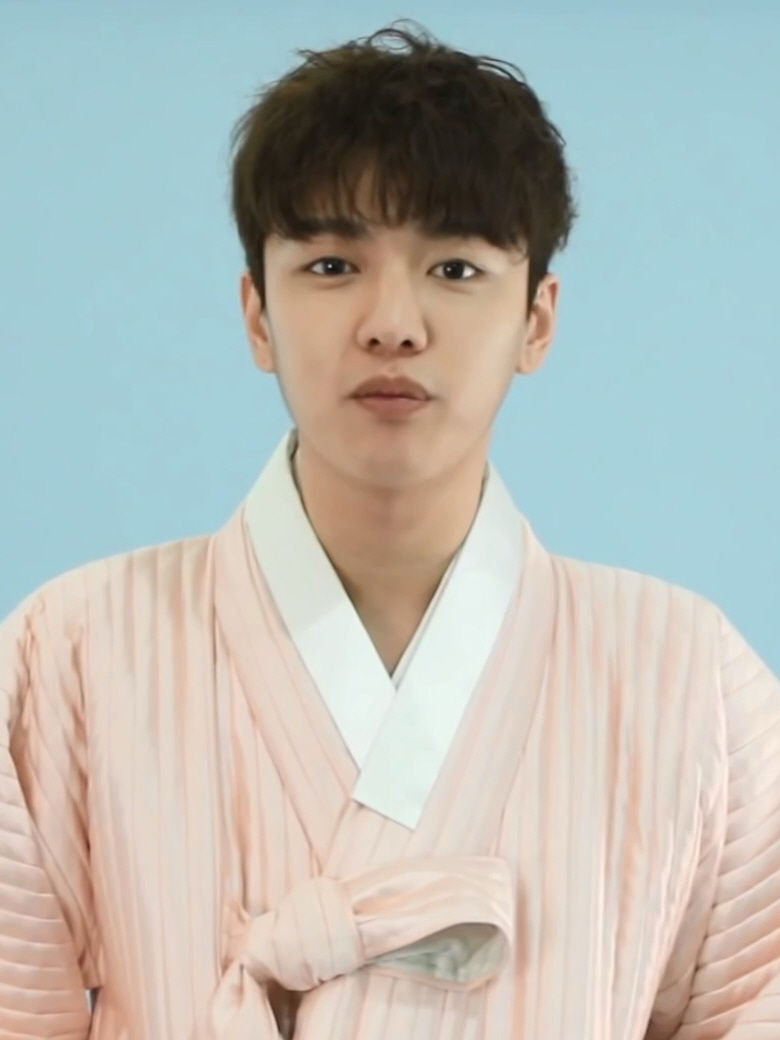
- Shin in 2017

Background information
- Also known as: Shin
- Born: 23 October 1991 (age 34); Seoul, South Korea
- Genre: K-pop
- Occupations: Singer; actor; model
- Instrument: Guitar
- Years active: 2011–present
- Label: Amuse Korea
- Member of: Cross Gene

Korean name
- Hangul: 신원호
- Hanja: 申原昊
- RR: Sin Wonho
- MR: Sin Wŏnho

Shin Won-ho (born 23 October 1991) is a South Korean singer, actor and member of multinational idol group Cross Gene. He was notable for his supporting roles in television series Bachelor's Vegetable Store (2011), Big (2012) and The Legend of the Blue Sea (2016).

== Discography ==
=== Singles ===
==== As lead artist ====
Title	Year	Peak chart positions	Album
Title	Year	KOR Down.	Album
"Serenade"	2018	—	Non-album single
"Time"	2019	—	Non-album single
"Strange Disco	2019	—	Non-album single
"Trust Me"	2020	—	Non-album single
"Fill Me"	2025	—	One
"Warzone"	2026	—	One
"Super Star"	2026	—	Non-album single

== Filmography ==
=== Film ===
Year	Title	Role	Ref.
2012	Run 60 – Game Over	Park Hong-ki	
2014	ZEDD	Nine	

=== Television series ===
Year	Title	Role	Network	Ref.
2011	Bachelor's Vegetable Store	Lee Chan-sol	Channel A	
2011	Run 60	Park Hong-ki	MBS	
2012	Big	Kang Kyung-joon	KBS2	
2015	Shuriken Sentai Ninninger	Silver (ep.25)	TV Asahi	
2015	Secret Message	Choi Kang	Naver TV Cast	
2016	Happy Marriage!?	Koide Enshio	Amazon Video	
2016	The Legend of the Blue Sea	Tae-oh	SBS	
2017	All the Love in the World	Geun Jun-huk	Naver TV Cast	
2017	Children of the 20th Century	Sa Min-ho	MBC	
2018	Risky Romance	Choi Jae-seung	MBC	
2018	Monkey & Dog Romance	Lee Sung-woo	Naver TV Cast	
2019	Love Affairs in the Afternoon	Park Ji-min	Channel A	
2019	Hip Hop King – Nassna Street		SBS	
2020	Lover of the Palace	Dong-gil	Naver TV	
2021	Somehow Family	Himself		

=== Variety show ===
Year	Title	Network	Notes	Ref.
2015	Dating Alone	JTBC	Host	
2017	Law of the Jungle in Sumatra	SBS	Cast member	

== Awards and nominations ==
=== Korean Hallyu Awards ===
Year	Nominated work	Category	Result
2012	Big	Best Male Model Advertising	Won
2012	Big	Best Rookie Actor	Won
