= Bajracharya (surname) =

Bajracharya is a Nepalese surname. Notable people with this surname include:

- Jharana Bajracharya, Nepalese actress
- Sahana Bajracharya, Nepalese model
- Nhyoo Bajracharya, Nepalese music composer and singer
- Nisthananda Bajracharya, Nepalese author
- Samita Bajracharya, Nepalese former Kumari
- Chanira Bajracharya, Nepalese former Kumari
- Dayananda Bajracharya, Nepalese professor
