= Chanira Bajracharya =

Nepalese kumari

Chanira Bajracharya (Nepali: चनिरा बज्राचार्य; born 1995) is a former Kumari or Living Goddess of Patan in Nepal. She was enthroned when she was five years old, and stepped down at fifteen upon reaching puberty. She went on to work as a credit analyst and Charya dance instructor, and serves as secretary of an organization focused on promoting Newar music.

== Biography ==
She was born in Nepal, chosen as living goddess in April 2000, and enthroned as Kumari when she was five years-old. She has stated that upon being enthroned she "instinctively" knew how to present herself and act with dignity. She listened to wishes, and has stated that she granted them or refused them based on "someone supreme", further stating that when Kumari, "you're not you, actually". In late-May 2001, she cried for four days in what was interpreted as a bad omen. The day after she stopped crying, the Nepalese royal massacre occurred. Her reign ended when she reached puberty at the age of 15 when she menstruated for the first time, as is customary for Kumaris. She was succeeded by Samita Bajracharya. Bajracharya is the niece of Dhana Kumari Bajracharya, one of the longest serving living goddesses, who reigned in Patan for three decades.

Bajracharya speaks fluent English, which she learned during her reign as Living Goddess. Following her retirement as Living Goddess, upon which she commented that she had to relearn to walk due to being carried on a palanquin for so long, she studied business administration at Kathmandu University, eventually earning a Master of Business Administration. She went on to work as a credit analyst in Australia. She also serves as a Charya dance instructor, viewing it as "reconnecting with" her previous self, and is secretary of an organization focused on promoting Newar music and musical instruments.
