= List of Where Is My Friend's Home episodes =

Where Is My Friend's Home (Korean: 내 친구의 집은 어디인가) is a South Korean reality television-travel show, part of JTBC's Saturday night lineup. The show's first season aired from February 7, 2015, to April 29, 2016.

== Episodes ==
The show visits various countries of cast and former cast of Non-Summit, with occasional friends and guests added.

| No. | Title | Original release date | Rating |
|---|---|---|---|
| 1 | "China" | February 7, 2015 | 2.41% |
The group are first filmed at their individual Seoul workplaces and/or schools; then meeting at the small apartment of Zhang, for dinner, and to make plans for their trip. During talks about misperceptions of China, Quintart brings up and dispels notions of it being "unclean" and "smelly". The group selects Lijiang in Yunnan, for their first stop, a favorite of Chinese Spring breakers and international travelers, and called "Venice of the East." The show follows their packing, flight from Incheon International Airport to Lijiang, and taxi arrangements there. Mondi, who studied Chinese language in Italy, and has spent time in China in the past, helps with the negotiations. The show concludes with a "race" by two groups of three trying to find their hotel, with Mondi leading Patry and Quintart, and Zhang leading Yoo and Rasch.
| 2 | "China" | February 14, 2015 | 2.65% |
The group settle in at the hotel, with room assignments made by seniority, with Yoo and Patry, Mondi and Zhang, and Quintart and Rasch. They then find a local restaurant for a beer. The following day, they start out for a day of touring in Lijiang, on foot, eating breakfast at an outdoor vendor's and greeting local school children, who speak English with them. The rest of the day, they split up for touring, in groups of three, as in the room assignments. Yoo-Patry slowly relax at a cafe, Mondi-Zhang encounter local women to share their tour, and Quintart-Rasch explore the province in an academic trip, including the study of ancient Chinese characters and symbols.
| 3 | "China" | February 21, 2015 | 3.17% |
The group wrapped up their stay in Lijiang by cooking dinner at the hotel, and leaving by train the following morning, with Zhang misplacing his passport in his luggage at the train station. They toured across the Yunnan province, called "Switzerland of the Orient", by train and bus, enjoying a morning bicycle ride, and stopping in the lake region for a boat ride to a local inn, where they rested and had a traditional meal. Patry was surprised with a non-conventional toilet at the inn. They then departed from Yoo at the airport, and the remaining five flew to Zhang's home in Anshan, in the northeast province of Liaoning. They greet locals on the city's bus and streets, who take pictures with them. At Zhang's home they are welcomed by ten of his relatives and given gifts of jade.
| 4 | "China" | February 28, 2015 | 2.77% |
The five friends enjoy time with Zhang's family, eating fruit, learning to make dumplings, and looking through Zhang's family photo album. At dinner, they share Chinese alcohol, toasts, and home cooking, over laughter and tears, as Zhang and his mother share stories of family history. After dinner, an elder does a magic show, then they all go to a local lounge for karaoke. The friends perform Backstreet Boys and family members sing Chinese songs, with Zhang's mother leading the dancing. At bedtime, Patry is left alone in Zhang's bedroom, and the remaining four friends make a slumber party in the living room. Mondi awakens first and chats with Zhang's mother as she prepares breakfast. Patry and Quintart sleep late, and they all share breakfast, and cleaning up. The show ends with Zhang dressing to go out, and buying flowers, for a meeting with a female friend.
| 5 | "China" | March 7, 2015 | 3.23% |
In the final episode on the China trip, Patry, Mondi, and Quintart enjoy community exercises in a local park with Zhang's mother, a haircut for Patry and market shopping for dinner. The friends encounter live silkworm pupae at the market. Tyler rests at home while Zhang dresses and attends a matchmaking luncheon, with a Chinese female. In the evening, Mondi and Quintart prepare an Italian meal for Zhang's relatives, while Rasch and Patry read about playing mahjong. After dinner, the friends and Zhang give gifts to Zhang's mother, and he spends some quiet time with her. Yoo, who had flown back to South Korea for commitments, arrives for a late introduction to Zhang's mother and the night's stay. On the last morning, Zhang's mother prepares breakfast and sends the friends off.
| 6 | "Belgium" | March 14, 2015 | 3.30% |
On the first episode of the Belgium trip, the group meets at Quintart's apartment in Seoul, without Rasch. Quintart teaches them "survival" French, how to greet with cheek kissing, and discusses plans to visit his sister in Brussels and his parents in Aywaille. They meet his parents on a video chat. The next day, the six friends visit the office of Ambassador François Bontemps, of the Embassy of Belgium in South Korea, to discuss their trip and Belgium. All seven pack, meet at the airport, and fly to Charles de Gaulle Airport in France, where Shakya plays a prank on Zhang by hiding his passport. They then travel by train and van to Brussels. In Brussels they tour the Grand-Place, meet fans, and eat at a local restaurant, where they are greeted by Quintart's older sister, Maëlle Quintart who speaks French and English with the friends, and entertains them with a belly dance. She takes them for an overnight stay at her home, where they discuss her cohabitation with her boyfriend, who is out of town, and thoughts from different cultural perspectives.
| 7 | "Belgium" | March 21, 2015 | 2.32% |
The group wrap up their visit with Quintart's sister after their night's stay. Mondi styles Shakya's and Yoo's hair, while the Quintarts take Rasch and Zhang shopping for the breakfast croissants and baguettes. After breakfast they say goodbye and split into groups of two for touring. Rasch, Yoo and Zhang travel by van to the town of Baarle-Hertog where they explore the streets and eat lunch at a local restaurant and taste the beer. Quintart, Mondi, Patry and Shakya travel by van to Bruges, exploring the canals of the "Venice of the North" and climb the Belfry of Bruges. Both groups meet up in Binche to enjoy the street Carnival of Binche. They then go back to Brussels, and visit the Délirium Café, in the streets of the Rue des Bouchers, to taste the local beers. The show concludes at their hotel, where they discuss Patry's emergency, his having lost the bag that contained his passport.
| 8 | "Belgium" | March 28, 2015 | 2.68% |
Quintart and Rasch tour Brussel's historical streets, while the rest remain at the hotel; Mondi again playing hairdresser and styling Zhang's hair. They all visit a car rental for a van and then part from Patry. Patry remains in Brussels to make a police report for his missing passport and visit the Canadian Embassy in Brussels for a replacement. He enjoys touring the city alone, taking photos and eating mussels and a large lunch. Quintart drives the van, taking the rest of the group on European route E40 to Liège, en route to visit his parents in Aywaille. The group is a little fearful of his driving, but relax with music. In Liege they return the rented van and search the streets for Quintart's favorite foods, stopping for the "historically first" Belgian french fries they have been told about. They then visit a famous hilly street of 374 steps, the Montagne de Bueren, and race to the top, finishing in this order: Shakya, Mondi, Quintart, Yoo, Rasch, and Zhang. Also, in Liege, they visit Quintart's maternal grandmother, bringing her flowers. They admire her youthful beauty in old photos and Quintart enjoys a waltz with her. Quintart drives them on to his parents' home, a country house just outside Aywaille. They settle in around the fireplace with jokes and a variety of beers from the village. The parents dress in formal evening clothes and Quintart's mother serves hors d'oeuvre (alternating French and English), during which time Patry arrives and joins the party.
| 9 | "Belgium" | April 4, 2015 | 2.82% |
On the first night at the Quintart's, they finish up a formal dinner, with more Belgian cuisine including pâté de truite and meatballs. The three Quintarts give Patry and Rasch a house and family history tour, including the attic. In the morning, mother Quintart takes Patry, Mondi and Shakya shopping for bakery goods, while father Quintart gives French lessons to Yoo and Zhang while they set the table. At breakfast, Mr. Quintart surprises them with party favors and fun with party horns and clown's noses and has Yoo dress in a French maid's costume to serve the table. They all visit the local riding stable where Mondi, Zhang, Quintart and Shakya ride the horses. They race home with piggyback rides among the friends. The friends then take a bicycle tour on the route of the cycle racing in Belgium and take pictures at Côte de La Redoute, a part of the Liège–Bastogne–Liège where "Phil" is painted on the roadway in honor of Philippe Gilbert. They then have an uphill bicycle race with Shakya in the lead, again, and Zhang last. Back home, Mr. Quintart gives Shakya a ride on his motorcycle. The three Quintarts take Rasch, Patry and Shakya to visit his old middle school and literature teacher; while Mondi, Zhang and Yoo visit town to shop at meat and vegetable shops, and cook dinner. The episode ends with the friends at Harzé Castle for a beer, where they meet Julian's two musician friends and his "first love".
| 10 | "Belgium" | April 11, 2015 | 2.11% |
The friends are still at Harzé Castle, meeting with Quintart's two old buddies, who are also in a band, Dalton Telegramme. The buddies surprise Quintart by bringing in an ex-girlfriend, his "first love", and all the friends tease him, embarrassing him. Later, Yoo, Mondi and Zhang have a cook-off for the dinner. Yoo prepares a glazed dish, Korean barbecue which causes the kitchen to fill with smoke, and is too spicy hot for Mr. Quintart. Zhang's dish is picked as the favorite. At dessert time, Mr. Quintart dresses as Darth Vader and cuts the cake with a sword, then adorns Yoo with holiday lights. The fun continues with everyone dancing to rock and roll. The night ends with Quintart drinking with his visiting buddies and the rest of the friends drinking, dancing and taking photographs at a slumber party on the dining room floor with sleeping bags. The following morning, the friends prepare to leave, and Patry parts first, with good-byes and gifts to the parents. The parents prepare a treasure hunt in the garden, as they used to do for the children. The friends find the "treasures" which are handwritten notes and a photo, to each of them, in memory of their stay. The friends give gifts to the parents, and Quintart reads a letter, in French, that Zhang prepared for the parents before saying final good-byes.
| 11 | "Nepal" | April 18, 2015 | 3.2% |
Yoo, Mondi, Zhang, Lindemann and Tetto meet with Shakya, at the parachute products company where he works in Seoul, for an international style dinner and travel plans; Mondi brings lasagna and sannakji and Zhang brings chicken feet. Shakya goes over some Nepali phrases, like Namaste and thank you "dhanyavaad," and later, at the airport, describes the Nepalese knife, the Kukri. The flight to Tribhuvan International Airport in Kathmandu encounters rough weather after the meal, and Zhang gets his sickness bag ready. They arrive during a thunderstorm, and as they get out their rain gear by the airport shuttle, Yoo notices their first monkeys running on top of the buildings. The domestic flight on to Pokhara by local airline Yeti Airlines is delayed. Waiting at the airport, they check their altimeter watches and find the elevation to be 1350 meters. Tetto is attracted to a pretty sales clerk and Mondi and Shakya join in the meeting. More time is spent playing a joke on Zhang with a note stuck to his back. Hooper's flight to meet the group encountered lightning and the bad weather and was diverted to Bangkok. At the Pokhara airport, Shakya recognizes a local actress, Krih Bhattarai, and he and the friends ask her to choose a favorite, and she chooses Lindemann. In Pokhara, the group split up to see the town; Yoo and Tetto play ping-pong with locals who entice them to their cashmere shop, while Shakya takes Lindemann to the barber. The show ends with Mondi and Zhang wandering the town.
| 12 | "Nepal" | April 25, 2015 | 2.6% |
(This episode was accompanied by televised announcements by JTBC and the show, in sympathy for victims of the 7.8 magnitude earthquake of April 25 that struck an area of Nepal between Kathmandu, and Pokhara, according to the United States Geological Survey, prior to the airing of the pre-recorded show.) The show resumes with the friends exploring the streets of Pokhara. Yoo and Tetto bargain with street vendors, visit a barber where Tetto gets a straight razor shave, and Yoo a hair wash and face massage. As they shop for headbands and pants, Shakya and Lindemann arrive in time for Shakya to discuss the rupees being charged. Mondi and Zhang get a view of Phewa Lake before meeting up with the others. Lindemann gets a "Nepali hero" style haircut, as described by a local, who says the cut makes him look like Bollywood actor Ajay Devgan; then shops for Nepalese clothing with Shakya. Shakya photographs the friends with three local women dressed in saris, who pick Yoo and Lindemann as their favorites, dressed in native clothing. Shakya takes them to a local restaurant for a typical Nepalese meal, the dal bhat tarkari and a local beer, Gorkha. He shows them local dining etiquette, how to wash up before the meal and how to eat with fingers, instead of utensils. They learn to mash the hot rice first, burning their fingers. Shakya discusses the Annapurna range of the Himalayas that surrounds Pokhara and the lake. Hooper sends a video message that he is still in Thailand with a friend. After a night at a local hotel, they tour the city streets. They meet a friendly dog, and Shakya explains the special relationship of dogs with Nepalese people and honoring them at Tihar. They view the mountaintops, including Mount Machhapuchchhre, and arrive at Phewa Lake. They carry traditional baskets of coconut and flowers aboard two-person boats. Tetto shows his boating proficiency, while Yoo enjoys the ride, and Zhang gives up rowing the boat to his partner Lindemann. They arrive at the Tal Barahi Temple on an island in the lake, where they perform a Hindu worship ritual, receive the red bindi on their foreheads and ring the ghantas, along with other visitors. The show ends with them making plans to go paragliding.
| 13 | "Nepal" | May 2, 2015 | 3.0% |
(The episode begins with a special message from Shakya and cast; along with news media video clippings of the earthquake. Included, social media comments expressing gratitude that the show had captured the beauty of Nepal, and memories of it, prior to the earthquake, and the importance of such broadcasts to raise awareness of the history of Nepal, its loss, and the hopes for rebuilding.) In Pokhara, the friends split up. Shakya, Tetto and Mondi take a van to the base camp at Dhampus Resort, just short of the Annapurna Circuit trek, where they start their climb to the mountain top of 1730 meters, after registering 1192 on their altimeter watches. For the first time in the show, the camera crew, on their arduous climb up, with equipment, is shown. At 1400 meters they pass native men, on their way down, carrying bundles of wood, wearing flip-flops on their feet. In the mountain community of Dhampus, they talk to a native woman who lives and farms on the mountain, and with a French couple of trekkers. At a tea stop they meet with local children, and enjoy the final view at the summit of Dhampus Kaski. Yoo, Zhang & Lindemann van to Sarangkot for paragliding, with Yoo and Zhang sharing a camera view of the glide; then all enjoy a local meal with another local beer called Everest. Both groups fly back, from Pokhara to Kathmandu, where they meet with the delayed Hooper at the airport, who had been there at age sixteen, when he climbed Mount Everest with another Briton of the same age. On the streets, walking to Shakya's home, they are greeted by a traditional band of Nepalese musicians, playing bansuri flutes and other Nepali instruments. Shakya is overwhelmed, and introduces the friends to the family members and his two sisters, accompanying the band. At his home, Shakya bows to his grandmother, the family matriarch, and greets his mother (who also speaks English) and his father. Yoo and Zhang, also, bow to his grandmother, amongst friendly laughter. The friends and camera crew (again appearing on camera) receive the red bindi blessing from the grandmother, flower garlands, and red and white neck scarves. The evening ends with the beginning of dinner and meeting with the grandmother and family.
| 14 | "Nepal" | May 9, 2015 | 2.6% |
The thali style dinner with home-made yogurt and chhaang alcohol continues, with the 78-year-old grandmother guessing their ages and choosing Tetto to have the fairest face. They meet all thirty family members on the upper-level balcony of the home, including younger sisters, Shristi, age 22 and Reecha, age 20 (who both, also, speak English). Shakya gives everyone a present, and the younger women lead the friends in dancing. They retire with the visiting friends all sharing a bedroom. In the morning, Shakya shows brotherly concern by chasing Reecha away from her chat with the group of friends. They join the grandmother for prayers, then assist with chores. They carry buckets of water from the local water well, making a competition of using the hand pump as curious neighborhood children look on. Returning home, on the balcony again, Zhang re-creates a Korean drama romance story, in his imagination, as he launders clothes barefoot in a tub, with Reecha. The father takes Shakya, Yoo, Mondi and Lindemann to visit the family herbal medicine shop in Thamel, passing by the Kathesimbhu Stupa and spinning prayer wheels. Lindemann asks about a postcard he sees of a young girl and Shakya explains Kumari goddess. The mother includes Hooper, Tetto and Zhang on her customary morning jog to the "Monkey Temple", Swayambhunath, one of the oldest Buddhist temples in Nepal, a World Heritage Site. Hooper wins the final race up the steps to the top of the hilltop shrine. She gives a tour, including the pujari and holy monkeys (who enjoy the cookies left by worshipers), they spin the prayer wheels and ring the ghanta, and see the prayer flags. During their discussions there, Mom says she would understand if Shayka wants to marry a non-Nepali girl. Viewing the city, she points out Dharahara, which the show follows up with media of the building, after it toppled, from the earthquake. (The show concludes with video cuts of the friends on the streets of Nepal and at the Monkey Temple, interspersed with media cuts of the damage done by the earthquake.)
| 15 | "Nepal" | May 16, 2015 | 2.2% |
The friends visit with the family at home. Mondi helps sister Reecha make masala chai tea which they all have with sweet snacks sel roti and jeri, etc. Teeto and Hooper help Mom with English reading and editing letters she had prepared for Shakya after he left home. She said Shakya taught himself Korean at home, and shares her own written practices of Korean. Sister Shristi and grandmother discuss arranged marriage and love marriage with Lindemann and grandmother says she wants Sujan to marry within their caste. The family and friends split up for touring, Mom takes Zhang, Teeto and Hooper to Bhaktapur. The show includes photos of the historical area after the earthquake. Dad, Shakya and family men take Yoo, Mondi, and Lindemann to Patan. They meet and talk to local high school boys, then visit the Living Goddess and her family at Ratnakar Mahavihara for a blessing. Again, after the visit, the show includes photos of the damage done by the earthquake. The friends then go market shopping for the evening meal. Back at home, Yoo, Zhang, Lindemann, Hooper, and Mondi cook dinner. Lindemann juggles limes for them and again at dinner for family and friends.
| 16 | "Nepal" | May 23, 2015 | 2.4% |
The seven friends travel by van to Kodari, practicing singing the Korean "Three Bears Song" along the way. On arrival, they walk on the suspension footbridge crossing the Bhote Koshi River in Sindhupalchowk District and observe the bungee jumping. They hike to an elementary school on one of the mountain's terraces where they meet with the school children. Shakya introduces them, along with the countries they are from. The children perform a dance, and the friends sing the song they prepared and gift them with school supplies. They return to the bridge where Shakya, Lindemann, Tetto and Zhang do the bungee or "swing" jump. Yoo plays a trick, having one of the camera men wear his clothing and make the jump. They finish the evening with dinner at a local restaurant and beer in their tent, talking about romance and marriage. Back in Kathmandu they visit Shakya's old school, Prime College, where they see The Kathmandu Post news clippings of Shakya in his school's basketball tournament win. They meet with three national athletes, Ajay Suwol (Table tennis at the 2010 Asian Games – Men's team and Table tennis at the 2014 Asian Games), Rajiv Joshi (Nepal national basketball team) and Deepak Bohora (Nepal Badminton Association). The friends lose a basketball match to the Nepalese team, made up of the three athletes and Prime College players. The show ends with a brief look at the table tennis match at Prime College, and with the friends trying to do a Yoga head stand that Hooper shows them.
| 17 | "Nepal" | May 30, 2015 | 2.5% |
On the last episode filmed in Nepal, family and friends meet for farewells and gift giving. Mom has prepared a card for Shakya written in Hangul and reads a card in English she wrote for all the friends. Shakya shares a video of his graduation at Dankook University which makes everyone cry. The friends receive bhaad-gaaule caps adorned with two crossed kukris, and singing bowls. They take their leave, as they arrived, on the streets, with a formal family send-off. The show follows up the originally filmed episodes with Shakya and Tetto returning to Kathmandu, on May 15, 2015, following the April and May 2015 Nepal earthquake. On arrival at the Kathmandu airport, they see the relief efforts underway, including Korean Red Cross supplies and workers. They travel to meet Shakya's grandmother and family, now living in a tent village outside their home. Shakya brings videos of the show, which they have not seen yet, and the family watch them into the evening. Shakya and Tetto visit the community, handing out solar USB chargers and solar cell phone chargers. Mom and Shristi take them to the family rooftop, despite the house's unstableness, for morning prayers. They return to Swayambhunath, the Monkey Temple, where they see the damages done there, remember their previous visit, and look out over the city's tent villages. They return to see the demolished Fasidega Temple where they had taken pictures in Bhaktapur. They do not visit Kodari again, but the show intersperses pictures of the previous school and children with the damages there now. Shakya and Tetto visit Korean Committee for UNICEF staff at the On-Site Operations Coordination Centre (OSOCC) and assist them with volunteer activities in their emergency tents, including one set up at the Hospital and Rehabilitation Centre for Disabled Children. Shakya gives emergency funds to emotional family members, and Tetto comforts him as they leave.
| 18 | "Italy" | June 6, 2015 | 2.8% |
During the Seoul dinner planning meeting, Mondi introduces his wife's younger sister to the traveling friends Yoo, Zhang, Lindemann, Deiana and Tetto; minus Hooper. They have a talent contest to impress her, Tetto and Lindemann each play piano, Zhang sings, and Deiana break dances. She picks the singing to be her favorite. Mondi, Zhang, Lindemann and Deiana fly to Milan and meet Hooper at the airport, where they rent a van and drive to the wine country in Toscana. They arrive at a residence at night, and share three bedrooms, with Mondi explaining the bathroom's bidet and how to use it. They awaken in the middle of beautiful farm scenery in a vineyard. Mondi styles his and Zhang's hair, Deiana styles his own and Lindemann's. They have an Italian breakfast including caffè latte and listen to a lecture on the Tuscan wine making process and overview the vineyard. They all van to the town of Pienza, a UNESCO World Heritage Site, which includes the Palazzo Piccolomini. They tour together, then split up, with Lindemann playing tour guide to Hooper, and also Zhang and Deiana, after they venture off for gelati. They then take a biking tour, simulating a more youthful trip Mondi made in the past, with two friends; with Zhang struggling and falling behind. Mondi, Lindemann and Zhang wear bib shorts and attempt to recreate a photograph of the earlier trip.
| 19 | "Italy" | June 13, 2015 | 2.9% |
Back at the Tuscan vineyard residence, the friends enjoy Italian cuisine with wine and crostini toscani, toasting with Italian "buon appetito" (enjoy your meal) and "altrettanto" (likewise). They photograph the bistecca alla fiorentina to share with the friends' best eater, Patry. They van to Saturnia to swim at the Cascate del Mulino (mill waterfalls), part of the Terme di Saturnia. They play a game, which Lindemann loses and has to take off his swimming trunks, then Deiana loses and has to sing his national anthem, La Marseillaise. They return to their residence for dinner and leave for Venezia the following morning. They tour the Piazza San Marco, St Mark's Basilica, St Mark's Campanile, admiring the lion gargoyles, and finish up with Palazzo Ducale and Ponte dei Sospiri where Mondi talks about Casanova, which was filmed there. Yoo and Tetto, meanwhile, arrive in Venezia or Venice via a speed boat trip, with Tetto speaking Italian and reenacting a scene from Titanic. They see a pretty shop girl and stop for a doctor fish spa treatment before arriving at their rented apartment in the historical Grand Canal area. They eat Venetian food at a local restaurant; including wine, costoletta and pizza. The next day they tour the city, seeing the carnival masks worn at Carnival of Venice and shop at the Rialto fish market, buying a large octopus, which they cook. They conclude their trip with a Grand Canal gondola ride, including a gondolier, accordion player and singer, passing under the Ponte di Rialto; Yoo sings his own "Italian/Korean" songs.
| 20 | "Italy" | June 20, 2015 | 2.6% |
Mondi and his group of friends, still at the Piazza San Marco, get obscure telephone directions from Yoo and Tetto to locate them at a café in Venice, and split up. Mondi and Zhang arrive first, stopping for caffè corretto with sambuca and grappa. Lindemann, Hooper and Deiana search for the location with "world adventurer" Hooper's lead, using sun directions, buying carnival masks, and stopping for Hooper's impromptu performance of Zadok the Priest in front of the Teatro La Fenice. They join the others at the Campiello del Spezier for more Italian cuisine, with Mondi explaining that Italian food is more than pizza and pasta. They visit Mondi's alma mater Ca' Foscari University of Venice and visit with a classroom of Korean language students. They then enjoy an aperitivo at an outdoor café, and take the vaporetto on the Grand Canal, with Mondi explaining the tourist sites, including the Guggenheim modern art museum, they pass by. They dock at the Port of Venice and meet Mondi's younger brothers, Stefano 27, Riccardo 22, and a female friend of Stefano's. Mondi and Stefano drive the friends in a van to Mirano to Mondi's home where they meet his parents and visiting relatives. They are greeted with a meal of wine, beer and more Italian foods, including crostini di baccalà mantecato, lasagna, baccalà alla vicentina and polenta.
| 21 | "Italy" | June 27, 2015 | 3.2% |
The friends have breakfast with the parents and head for a local football field where Mondi and his father pick teams. Mondi's team with brother Stefano, Yoo, Lindemann and Deiana outperform the father's team of brother Riccardo, Hooper, Zhang and Tetto; even with Hooper and Zhang faking injuries for fouls. After the game, the friends visit Mondi's grandparent's home. Yoo, Zhang and Lindemann help till the garden. Lindemann loses a game they play and has to kneel for the camera and send a message to actress Kim So-yeon. At lunch, along with pasta, Mondi introduces the friends to a number of Italian meats including prosciutto crudo, prosciutto e melone, sopressa, porchetta and pancetta. Returning to the parent's home, they split up; Mondi takes Yoo and Lindemann for haircuts, Hooper and Deiana shop for vegetables, Zhang and Tetto shop for meats. All the friends cook Korean cuisine - japchae, jeon, bibim guksu and galbi for the Mondi's thirty-fifth wedding anniversary celebration, with wine, cake and candles. Mondi presents them with gifts of matching hanbok and a touching video message.
| 22 (part 1) | "Italy" | July 4, 2015 | 2.5% |
Still in Mirano, the friends meet Mondi's Italian friends, two couples and another male; communicating in Italian, Korean and English. They discuss Mondi's dating the female of one of the couples, before she married his other friend, and Hooper brings up the different cultural perceptions of this in Korea. Yoo is picked as the favorite, and he has a "funny face" contest with the Italian friends. The friends part with the Mondi brothers, and travel by van to Bassano del Grappa where they tour with the parents. They hear about Italy's first king, Victor Emmanuel II of Italy and tour the Piazza Libertà. As they walk across the Ponte degli Alpini the parents sing the soldier's song Sul Ponte Di Bassano. Lindemann, Hooper and Deianna visit a grappa distillery; Yoo, Zhang and Tetto have an outdoor café aperitivo; and Mondi and his parents spend time together. They all meet at a cafe for a farewell meal and gift giving and a handwritten note in Italian from Tetto.
| 22 (part 2) | "Canada" | July 4, 2015 | 2.5% |
Patry has a garden meeting in Seoul with Yoo, Zhang and Shakya to discuss travel plans and introduces the new friends, New Zealand Embassy's John Denis Riley (born in 1976), and Super Junior's Henry (stage name). Patry and Henry banter over their respective homes in Quebec and Toronto, and Patry confesses to being in Korea for 16 years, and not knowing much about Canada now. Zhang tests Henry on his language skills, as Henry said he speaks Mandarin and Cantonese, along with Korean, and his native English. Patry, Yoo, Riley and Shakya visit Canadian Ambassador Eric Walsh's Seoul residence. Walsh recommends a favorite Canadian dish, poutine, and explains Canada's national symbol, the maple leaf. When Yoo asks about Patry's "fashion" in Canada, Walsh says that Canadians might not be the most fashionable in the world, but they are very practical; and describes Canada as having cultures from all around the world living together.
| 23 | "Canada" | July 11, 2015 | 3.7% |
Patry, Riley, Zhang and Shakya fly to Toronto Pearson International Airport and split up with their Canadian dollars to travel to Niagara Falls. Zhang and Shakya have an airport coffee and Shakya greets the workers from India and the Philippines in English. They take a luxury SUV airport limousine service and the driver is, also, from India. At the hotel, Zhang is happy to greet the hotel's Chinese clerk in Chinese. Their room overlooks the Niagara River and Niagara Falls. Patry and Riley take an economical bus with other passengers and settle in a hotel room with no view of the falls. They meet up for dinner at a sports bar in Clifton Hill, for beer and global cuisine of buffalo wings, shrimp tacos, grilled chicken salad, pizza and French fries. They play the bar's electronic sports games, DDR, basketball and table tennis; then ride the Niagara SkyWheel. The next day Patry and Zhang take the Hornblower Niagara Cruises falls tour and a Niagara Whirlpool jet boat tour on the river to the Canadian Falls. They see the Lewiston–Queenston Bridge and Sir Adam Beck Hydroelectric Generating Stations, and Patry explains Canada-U.S. sports rivalry with ice hockey. Shakya and Riley take the Journey Behind the Falls and read about Niagara Falls stunters; then take a helicopter tour of the falls. The group then travel by van to Toronto where Yoo and Henry have already arrived and toured Downtown Toronto and the CN Tower.
| 24 | "Canada" | July 18, 2015 | 4% |
All the friends join in Toronto for touring. They meet street musicians from Ecuador and Henry plays fiddle and the friends dance with them. They tour Kingston Market and St. Lawrence Market where Yoo talks to a Korean shopkeeper. At Henry's family home in a Toronto suburb they meet his parents, 28-year-old brother Clinton, and a male friend who speaks Korean. The mother speaks Chinese to Zhang and they all converse in English and Korean. They have an impromptu concert in the family room with international music, Clinton (piano) and Henry (violin), the parents play piano solos, and Riley (guitar) and Henry (violin) finish with Busker Busker's "Cherry Blossom Ending". They share a meal of Chinese dishes, including tea eggs and talk about Henry's past, his auditioning for S.M. Entertainment and moving to Korea, and how the family felt about it. They enjoy time in the family karaoke room singing "My Way" and "Billie Jean" in English, while the parents dance. Later in the night, younger sister Whitney, who placed in the Miss Chinese Toronto Pageant in 2013, meets with Zhang, with all Lau family members present. In the morning, they fly to Quebec City and tour, visiting a local restaurant to taste the beers and sites including Château Frontenac and Old Quebec. They visit a video game room where Patry, ex-Professional StarCraft competition 1999 champion player, is challenged by Henry.
| 25 | "Canada" | July 25, 2015 | 3.2% |
The show starts with 1999 news clippings and video of Patry's time as a pro StarCraft player, alias "Grrrr...", and his move to South Korea. The friends continue the StarCraft challenge at the Canadian PC bang and Henry telephones ex-pro, and television personality, Hong Jin-ho, alias "YellOw", for strategy advice, but still loses to Patry. In Charlesbourg, they meet Patry's mother, where she lives in a co-op by herself. They visit over wine and camembert and the mother speaks French and English. Patry's brother is shown in a photo. Patry and Yoo go to Maxi to buy local beers, Moson Export ale and a Molson Brewery taster's pack. At home, they prepare a birthday surprise for Patry, blowing up balloons, and practicing singing French, "bonne fête" and Korean, "saengil chukka hamnida", and surprise him with cake and candles. Over the dinner of tourtière and salad, they discuss Patry's past girlfriends. In the morning, all the friends, except Henry, jog and exercise at a local park, then jump into a cold above-ground swimming pool, with Patry and Riley throwing in reluctant Shakya and Zhang. Henry stays at home to cook breakfast, playing Please Take Care of My Refrigerator chef, timing his food prep and omelette, which he changes to scrambled eggs after he has trouble with the frying pan. They all eat breakfast, with birthday gifts for Patry and a gift for mother.
| 26 | "Canada" | August 8, 2015 | 2.6% |
All the friends (except Yoo, who is not in this episode) visit Patry's old friend, firefighter François at the Ville de Québec Incendie fire station. They meet with firefighters (speaking French and English), François and Henry do one arm chin-ups in the gym, and they all spray the fire hose. Patry and his mother take a trip to Montmorency Falls for a quiet walk and time to talk. Zhang, Riley, Shakya and Henry tour Quebec with a male tour guide. Henry jokes and tells him "I love you" in English, but the guide says you say that to a woman. They visit the Place d'Armes, the Petit Champlain's Breakneck Stairs and streets, Notre-Dame-des-Victoires Church where Catch Me If You Can was filmed, and the Fresque des Québécois. Henry gets recognized at a shop and gives autographs to the clerks, and plays fiddle with a street musician, as they all sing "Let It Be" and "Get Up, Stand Up"; followed by lunch. After parting with Patry's mother, they visit his childhood home, that was built by his parents, now divorced. They meet Patry's father, his new wife, who is from Cuba and speaks Spanish, his older brother, Pierre-Oliver (age 35), and Pierre-Oliver's girlfriend and her little girl. They see Patry's StarCraft awards, skis and photos of his youthful competition ski racing. The Patrys' prepare a backyard barbecue of several meats, rice and Cuban frijoles colorados stew, fresh mangos, salad, and wine. Patry and Shakya climb the house to the second-floor bedroom window like Patry did, as a boy. They eat and sing "Do You Want to Build a Snowman?", Frank Sinatra's "New York" and Henry plays guitar and sings his favorite "The Lazy Song". Patry says he and his father do not express emotions and the friends convince him to tell his father he loves him.
| 27 | "South Korea (Buyeo County)" | August 15, 2015 | 2.3% |
All the friends, except Rasch, meet Professor Yoo at Myongji University for a history lesson and trip plans. The next day, they meet and travel by bus to South Chungcheong Province. Professor Yoo divides them into two teams Yoo, Lindemann, Zhang, Rasch and Jun, Patry, Mondi, Williams. They arrive in Gongju at the fortress Gongsanseong, where the teams race in an Indiana Jones "adventure" like treasure hunt game and Jun's team wins. Yoo's team loses, but has fun whistling with blades of grass. After a picnic lunch at nearby Gomnaru, or "bear port", Professor Yoo and the cast visit the Tomb of King Muryeong, where they learn of its 1971 discovery and excavation, as well as the history of the other royal tombs at Songsan-ri. They visit the tomb's replica at the Gongju National Museum. They travel to Buyeo County, the capital of the former kingdom Baekje, and visit the Five storied stone pagoda of Jeongnimsa Temple site for a history lesson and prayer. The last stop is to a western village in Chungcheongnam-do where Professor Yoo introduces his wife and tells the story of how they met, and the friends swim in a local stream.
| 28 | "South Korea (Buyeo County)" | August 22, 2015 | 2.5% |
Continuing from the previous episode, the friends finish cooling off in a local waterfall and dry up as they change clothes, including work pants that Professor Yoo's wife gives them. The friends pretend to have a mini fashion show as they are wearing the work pants. Before the cast have their dinner, they first meet with the village community and thank the villagers for inviting them to their town. The members and the rest of the community have dinner all together, eating a wide variety of local Korean foods. Yoo and Jun entertains the community with some singing, while trying to persuade Professor Yoo and his wife to sing, but they decline. The cast prepare to sleep, with Jun, Rasch and Williams sharing the room, while Mondi and Lindemann stay the night over at another house offered by one of the ladies of the community. Yoo, Patry and Zhang sleep outside in a transparent tent. The next morning, Professor Yoo's wife prepares them breakfast with fruits such as watermelons and vegetable juice. Mondi and Lindemann have breakfast at the lady's house, and meet a young boy who shares the same name as Jun. After breakfast, the cast thank Professor Yoo's wife for her hospitality and they depart the village to their first destination of the day, the Janghari 3-storey stone pagoda. They learn of its history and offer a prayer, before learning of how Baekje's culture influenced the Japanese. Their next destinations are Baekma River, and the forterss Buseosanseong. The cast travel on a traditional wooden boat and start singing a traditional folk song. As they enter the fortress, they enter a cave by the fortress that is said to contain water that is similar to the Fountain of Youth. Afterwards, they visit Nakhwaam, a pagoda with views over the river. Their final destination is the Buyeo National Museum, where the friends take a look at ancient relics related to the Baekje kingdom, such as the Gilt-bronze Incense Burner of Baekje. Professor Yoo, on the other hand, has become a celebrity in the museum, continuously being asked for signatures. The episode ends with the cast doing a final quiz on the history and Yoo's team wins. As a gift, Professor Yoo presents the cast members each with a paper fan.
| 29 | "Australia" | August 29, 2015 | 3.0% |
The episode begins with Williams introducing his new apartment in Seoul which he moved into recently. In Wollongong, Australia, Hooper is showing his recent experiments at the University of Wollongong. He then goes to have a run at North Wollongong beach with a friend. On the day of departure, Williams arrives at the airport first and then meets up with Mondi, Zhang, Lindemann and newest cast member Takuya Terada. They then meet Yoo in the airplane and board the 10-hour flight to Sydney. On the flight, Terada is sitting by himself and converses with another foreigner. The cast arrive at Sydney Airport and meet up with Hooper, who travelled to Sydney to meet them at the airport by car from Wollongong. The cast is then divided into two teams, with Mondi and Zhang staying in Sydney for a city tour and Yoo, Lindemann, Williams and Terada following Hooper to Wollongong. In the road trip to Wollongong, Hooper promises to show the "slow life" of Australia and debates with Williams about the history of the country. They stop over at Bald Hill and Stanwell Park for a rest, enjoying the views and taking photos. They then get some coffee and encounter bikers on their Harley-Davidsons. Meanwhile, Mondi and Zhang tour the Sydney Opera House and the Sydney Harbour Bridge. They take some photos and get coffee, where Zhang takes a photo with a worker. They then ride a tour bus, where Mondi is reluctant at first, but Zhang persuades him to ride it anyway. They go sightseeing on the bus, viewing famous landmarks such as St Mary's Cathedral, Sydney Tower, the Queen Victoria Building, the Sydney Town Hall and the Royal Botanic Gardens. On the other hand, Hooper's team drives over the Sea Cliff Bridge, famous for a Ferrari advertisement. They finally arrive at North Wollongong beach and enjoy the views. The cast want to enjoy the beach, but Hooper prepares two activities: parachuting and rock climbing. However, whoever wins first in a running race along the beach can freely choose what they want to do between these two activities. So, the cast race along the beach, with Lindemann, Terada and Williams winning in first, second and third respectively. Lindemann, Yoo and Hooper choose to go rock climbing, whereas Williams and Terada decide to go skydiving. The cast then have fun in the waters. The episode ends when Mondi and Zhang visit the Sydney Fish Market and have some seafood, along with some beer. Afterwards, they go to a hot dog stand, where Zhang and Mondi look at photos and learn of its history.
| 30 | "Australia" | September 5, 2015 | 3.0% |
Yoo, Lindemann and Hooper enjoy the view of Wollongong before hiking a hill to go rock climbing with some instructors. Hooper and Yoo climb the rock up first but both struggle with barely a meter's height. Lindemann also struggles, but manages to climb around halfway through than the others. Hooper tries again, but this time climbs up to the top. Yoo mentions that Hooper's adventure skills have helped him climb up to the top. On the other hand, Williams and Terada prepare to go tandem skydiving. Williams is scared and has doubts about his first experience with skydiving, but Terada manages to keep himself calm. They fly into the plane and drop at 14,000 feet. Williams drops first, followed by Terada. Mondi and Zhang arrive at Wollongong from Sydney and meet up with Williams and Terada, who had just landed from skydiving. They both enjoyed the experience and receive their certificates. The cast meet Hooper's Korean wife at his small apartment, who tells them about how the two of them met and talks about their marriage, where Terada finds a letter from Hooper to his wife and lets Yoo read it aloud to everyone. Hooper's wife then treats them with vegan foods. Mondi asks Hooper whether he would want to live in Australia, the UK or Korea, but doesn't decide. The cast then ride to a campsite, where they have trouble setting up tents. They joke that the "slow life" Hooper mentioned is not what it seemed to be. They split into two teams, with Yoo, Zhang, Lindemann and Williams in one team, and Mondi, Hooper and Terada in the other. Afterwards, the cast prepare for a barbecue and a campfire, with foods such as onion, sausages and to their surprise, kangaroo meat. Yoo and Williams have trouble setting up the bonfire, but Hooper helps them out. The cast then enjoy their dinner with their BBQ and beer, but with the cast too busy indulged in their dinner, Terada decides to entertain them with his dancing of Sistar's latest title, Shake It. At first, most of the members don't even seem to notice him, but manages to put on a show when he dances again, gaining the attention of the other friends. Feeling bad for Terada, they try to copy the dance moves sans Zhang and Hooper, who are too busy with the food. The episode ends with the friends sleeping in the staff's dormitory instead due to the cold weather outside and them waking up the next morning.
| 31 | "Australia" | September 12, 2015 | 2.8% |
The episode begins with Hooper preparing yogurt, cereal and milk tea for the friends in the morning. They then go to Killalea State Park for some Vinyasa yoga with Hooper's yoga instructor. The friends struggle with stretching except for Hooper, who has been doing yoga for the last 6 months. Following their morning yoga session, they then go surfing at Killalea Beach. They are taught how to surf by two female instructors, before entering the water. All the friends struggle to surf, however Terada manages to succeed. Lindemann eventually succeeds as well, whilst having fun. On the other hand, Yoo and Hooper have no problem surfing due to previous experience. Following their time in Wollongong, they fly to Brisbane, to visit Williams' family. They first visit Williams' home, and the friends are overwhelmed to see his house being so huge. The friends then meet Williams' mother and father. However, they are also welcomed by his huge family. Williams' family prepares some barbecue, with foods such as sausages and steak. During dinner, they are treated with a homemade salad along with beer. Yuan and Terada talk about Williams' younger sister while Hooper is too indulged in his food. The friends make short introductions to Williams' parents, with his mother choosing Terada with the best first impression. She asks Terada to dance after seeing him dance with Blair on Non-Summit followed by Williams asking his younger sister to show off some ballet dancing. Lindemann curiously asks how the parents met, and their love story. Williams talks about his family life and his relationship with his other siblings, and what his parents think of his life in Korea. After the dinner, the friends are divided into multiple rooms before they sleep, where at one point Yoo and Zhang listen to Lindemann play the piano. The next morning, Williams' father prepares breakfast for the cast before they join along. They have fruit, such as strawberries and oranges, with eggs and bacon. Afterwards, Williams shows the cast a tour of the house, where they are introduced to many rooms, including his father's office working as an architect. Outside they see the other houses owned by the Williams' family, a small forest and river. The father fills the bird feeders for the local birds, including galah cockatoos and rainbow lorikeets.
| 32 | "Australia" | September 19, 2015 | 2.6% |
The friends visit the South Bank in Brisbane, splitting into two teams, Zhang, Williams, Terada and Yoo, Mondi, Lindemann, Hooper. Williams details sites in the outdoor market; one of the city's eco-bridges, the Goodwill Bridge, eco taxis, and the warning signs for koalas, kangaroos and echidnas. They shop at a candy store, buying worm gummies and try to fit in a small toy truck there. Yoo's team visits Stanley Street for hot chocolate and hat shopping for an ideal look to attract women for Lindemann, with advice from Mondi. At the city beach, two women from Canada select Mondi as the best choice in the hats, and an elderly couple later select Yoo. All the friends meet at the South Bank ferry wharf and travel by CityCat on the Brisbane River to Williams' alma mater, the University of Queensland at the main campus in St Lucia, while viewing the Kurilpa Bridge and playing with the worm gummies. Williams gives a campus tour and Mondi discusses the difference in European universities, stating that Italy does not have the idea of "university campuses". They play a game of bubble football against the university's girls' football team; with Zhang and Mondi scoring goals for their win. They ferry back to the city for a dinner of beer, fish and chips and ham hock salad, then visit Williams' sister's ballet studio. She performs a practice piece for an upcoming London performance, and says ballet is her priority over university and she has made sacrifices in order to achieve her dreams. The friends wear tutus and practice ballet with her, and she and Terada have a couple's dance. They travel to the Gold Coast and a high-rise hotel, enjoying the views of the city from their room. Williams offers plans for a hot air balloon ride the following day, which only Terada agrees to.
| 33 | "Australia" | September 26, 2015 | 2.1% |
The final episode of the Australia trip begins with Williams and Terada getting up early in the morning to go ride a hot air balloon in Gold Coast. They ride a bus to the site and prepare the balloon, where they view a magnificent scenery of Australia, even able to look at Brisbane from their spot. Meanwhile, the other friends awake from their room, and Mondi and Hooper prepare breakfast, serving the others with foods such as scrambled egg, bread and coffee, whilst enjoying the views of Gold Coast. After breakfast, the friends decide to go visit Surfers Paradise. They go have a run along the beach before going surfing. Whilst the friends are struggling to surf properly, Zhang roams around Centro Surfers Paradise by himself and mistakenly buys some baby oil instead of tanning oil. Afterwards, he returns to the beach and creates a bed made of sand. Yoo scrubs some baby oil on Zhang while Mondi and Hooper bury him with the sand. The friends altogether go visit Australia's largest theme park, Dreamworld, where they interact with some kangaroos and koalas. The friends then split, with Yoo, Mondi, Lindemann and Zhang ride a rollercoaster, and Zhang, Williams and Terada moving together to ride the Tower of Terror II. Meeting up altogether, the friends decide to ride the rollercoaster Yoo's team had been on, with Hooper re-enacting a similar rollercoaster scene from Mr. Bean. The cast return to Williams' home in Brisbane where they have a potluck party with family and friends. After Williams introduces his extended family to the friends, he and Terada perform a dance for the crowd, as well as dancing with some family members. Yoo, Williams and his cousin entertain the crowd with some funny faces, and Lindemann plays the piano. Williams thanking his family and the cast for all the experiences during their time in Australia, before the episode finishing off with a group photo of the friends and family.
| 34 | "France" | October 3, 2015 | 2.5% |
The friends' trip to France begins with Tetto and Deiana meeting up at the airport to board the flight to Paris. After arriving at Charles de Gaulle Airport, the two friends tour around the city, visiting places such as the Eiffel Tower and Montmartre. They visit the Place du Tertre in Montmartre where they have their caricatures drawn by a local artist. On their first night in Paris, they visit the Lapin Agile cabaret, famous for where artists such as Pablo Picasso and Claude Monet have visited and where singer Édith Piaf had her performances. In the cabaret, they hear a bunch of singers and the host introduces Deiana to the crowd after noticing they are filming for the show. On the other hand, the other friends, Patry, Mondi, Zhang and Okyere are preparing for the trip at the homes in Seoul and eventually board the plane to Paris, where Okyere mentions that this is his first time to Europe. Okyere is excited to visit Paris, where he wants to visit the famous landmarks such as the Eiffel Tower and the Louvre. Patry, Mondi, Zhang and Okyere finally arrive in Paris, but they board another flight, this time to Marseille in southern France, much to Okyere's disappointment. Deiana and Tetto's next destinations are the communes of Giverny and Barbizon, both famous for their arts. They first visit Barbizon, its setting famous for Jean-François Millet's The Gleaners artwork. Tetto talks about the setting through his knowledge of art, especially the story behind Millet's The Angelus painting. They then visit Giverny, the town synonymous with Claude Monet's paintings. Eventually, the two friends meet up with the others at Marseille Provence Airport and leave for an apartment Deiana had reserved during their stay in France. The next morning, the friends have breakfast, drinking hot chocolate and eating croissants. Deiana tells the friends that they will first visit a seafood market in Marseille before boarding a boat to the islands of the Frioul archipelago, the setting that mainly inspired Alexandre Dumas' The Count of Monte Cristo. The friends visit places such as the Vieux Port, the seafood market and the Notre-Dame de la Garde. The friends board the boat to the archipelago, specifically to the island of If. On the boat, Patry and Okyere converses with a woman in French before being splashed over by the waves of the ocean. The episode ends with the friends arriving on the island, boarding a train to the top of the island before going swimming in one of the beaches.
| 35 | "France" | October 10, 2015 | 2.3% |
Still on the Frioul archipelago, the friends enjoy a beach swim, play swim games and have a team race around a buoy. Deiana and Patry help Zhang who is using a swim ring, but Mondi, Tetto and Okyere win. From the island they board a motor yacht; excited with the luxury, they dance and sing Exid's "Up & Down", sunbathe on the deck, and while anchored, dive in the Bay of Marseille, helping Zhang learn snorkeling. On the return to Marseille, they pass by the Château d'If. Back in Marseille, they eat dinner at the Chez Fonfon, a restaurant in the fishing village Vallon des Auffes, overlooking the boat docks. They have white wine, an appetizer of frozen crushed mango with mint leaves, French bread, and the traditional dish of bouillabaisse. They wander the streets of the Old Port of Marseille, watching jump rope street performers who recognize Patry and ask him to join them; then Deiana dances b-boy style and Mondi plays guitar while the group sings badly and laughs. They rest for the evening and breakfast in their hotel, making plans to split up for touring. Zhang, Tetto and Okyere travel to Fontaine-de-Vaucluse, singing K-pop songs in the van, and on arrival, tour and wade barefoot in the cold Sorgue spring waters, and hike the near-by mountain to see Le secret de la Fontaine or source of the spring. The rest of the friends set off for Avignon.
| 36 | "France" | October 17, 2015 | 2.3% |
Deiana, Mondi and Patry travel to Avignon, singing Sur le Pont d'Avignon in the van, and visit the Palais des Papes. All meet in Arles, ride a merry-go-round and split up to tour. Tetto, Zhang and Okyere walk the Vincent van Gogh marked tour, visiting the Cafe Terrace on the Place du Forum. Tetto leads the discussion about the painter's life, including his unrequited loves for Eugénie Loyer and Kee Vos Stricker, his mistress Sien, and Margot Begemann's love for him. At the River Rhône they discuss Paul Gauguin's influence on his work, then his phrase "La tristessa durera toujours" or "the sadness will last forever" at the Hospital in Arles, where they write postcards to friends. Deiana, Mondi and Patry take an historic walk, observing the Thermes de Constantin, or historic Roman baths, and meet up with the others at the Arles Amphitheatre for the course camarguaise or bloodless bullfights where "raseteurs" try to grab a rosette from the head of the bull. Afterwards they stop in a restaurant for a traditional Spanish meal of meat and seafood paella and sangria. They travel north by van to Avallon to the home of Deiana's parents, Italian father and French mother, who had been guests on Non-Summit, older brother Gaël, and see photos of older brother Loïc. They visit Deiana's old room and see his breakdancing photos and awards, then have a breakfast of croissants, cheese, fruit and juice.
| 37 | "France" | October 28, 2015 | 2.0% |
The beginning of this episode begins with Deiana's mother taking Patry, Mondi and Zhang to a winery near Avallon. There, the friends learn about the wine making process and all have a glass of white wine. Afterwards the friends visit a vineyard nearby, learning how to pick the best grapes, tasting the grapes and creating juice using the grapes that make Chardonnay. The three once again meet up with Tetto, Deiana and Okyere, visiting the local swimming pool Deiana went to ever since he was younger. There, Deiana introduces his swim instructor from his youth and go diving first before the friends have fun swimming and have a contest. Meanwhile, Deiana's parents prepare dinner for the cast while they go swimming. When the friends return, they are greeted by Deiana's oldest brother, Loïc. They drink red Burgundian wine with cherry tomato and mozzarella, saucisson and goat cheese, with pork brochettes as appetizers. The friends enjoy Beef bourguignon with mashed potatoes during dinner and ask the family about Deiana's life in Korea. Deiana's parents also tells the friends about how they met and their love story, despite not being married. The friends are then served with dessert, such as Époisses de Bourgogne and some chocolate cake with Aqua vitae. The episode ends with the friends singing songs with the family on the dinner table.
| 38 (part 1) | "France" | November 4, 2015 | 1.7% |
The final episode of the France trip begins with the friends staying over at the Deiana house on their final night. The morning after, Tetto, Deiana, Okyere and Deiana's father ride to Morvan Regional Natural Park to go rafting as an ideal wishlist for Deiana's father. After the joyous experience, the cast reunite with Mondi, Zhang and Patry to visit Deiana's old friends from his b-boying days in Avallon. The cast enjoy having competition with the dancers, such as rope climbing and arm wrestling, in addition to breakdancing. In the final moments of the trip, the friends prepare a surprise lunch outdoors for Deiana's parents, where they enjoy singing songs as well as Loïc reading a farewell letter from his youngest brother.
| 38 (part 2) | "Germany" | November 4, 2015 | 1.7% |
Lindemann meets with the cast of the Germany trip, Yoo, Ashminov, Mondi, Zhang, Okyere and Williams at Ashminov's restaurant in Seoul. The friends joke about Germany being a "boring" country, as Lindemann is known for being "boring" on Non-Summit and on the show. Lindemann discusses that the cast will go see football from the German league, Bundesliga, and meeting Koo Ja-cheol from FC Augsburg. He also plans to take the friends to Oktoberfest, Germany's most famous beer festival, visiting Lindemann's mother and stepfather in Langenfeld (near Cologne) and clubbing in Berlin.
| 39 | "Germany" | November 11, 2015 | 2.4% |
The episode begins with Lindemann introducing his house in Seoul, before packing his items he will carry to the trip to Germany. Soon after, the friends Zhang, Mondi, Lindemann, Williams and Ashminov board the plane to Frankfurt, without Okyere and Yoo, who will join them later. After arriving at Frankfurt Airport, the friends ride a car to Oberwesel, famous for its vineyard as well as the location of Schönburg Castle. They arrive at the castle, now being used as a hotel, where the cast will be staying for the night. The friends then go have dinner at the restaurant in the hotel, where they are served with smoked fish pie, crostino with mushroom cappuccino soup and venison. Afterwards, they enter their room and sleep. Lindemann tries to prank Ashminov and Williams, who stay in a double bed together in the middle of the night but doesn't work. The next morning, the friends have breakfast with foods such as bread roll. After breakfast, the friends have a tour of the castle, visiting the museum and playing around with souvenirs at the gift shop. The team then decides to split up, with Lindemann, Ashminov and Mondi watching a football game between Bayern Munich and 1. FSV Mainz 05, while Zhang and Williams visit the city of Heidelberg. The episode ends with Mondi, Ashminov and Lindemann watching the football game as it is about to start.
| 40 | "Germany" | November 18, 2015 | 2.7% |
Ashminov and Mondi watch the football game from the stands, while Lindemann is reporting from the sides of the pitch. During half time, Mondi and Ashminov go for refreshments such as bratwurst and beer, before the game ends with Bayern Munich winning 3-0 to 1. FSV Mainz 05. On the other hand, Lindemann is in the press room and holds an interview with Julian Baumgartlinger of the latter team. On the other hand, Zhang and Williams travel to Heidelberg, where they visit the Heidelberg University campus and Heidelberg Castle. They also make a visit to the Heidelberg University Library, the oldest library in Germany. They have lunch in the dining halls of the university, conversing with two German students and Williams asks them whether being "boring" is a "German thing" or it's just Lindemann, to which they reply it's probably only him. Okyere arrives at Munich Airport, and reunites with Zhang and Williams at a restaurant, before meeting up with the rest of the friends at the hotel. Lindemann tells the friends his plans for the next day, with Mondi and Okyere meeting Koo Ja-cheol of FC Augsburg while Ashminov, Zhang, Lindemann and Williams will visit the Dachau concentration camp. The day after, Ashminov, Zhang, Lindemann and Williams visits the concentration camp, where they learn of the horrific events that had happened in the place during World War II and the Holocaust. They also discuss the history of the place as well as what had happened during the Holocaust. Meanwhile, the episode ends with Mondi and Okyere travel to WWK Arena in Augsburg to visit the football team and greet Koo.
| 41 | "Germany" | November 25, 2015 | 2.9% |
Mondi and Okyere discuss with Koo about life in Germany and in Korea, where Koo shows off his German. Afterwards, the friends reunite in Munich in Bavaria, and they first have a look at the nearby Juliet statue, from the famous Romeo and Juliet play by William Shakespeare, before heading off to Oktoberfest, the famous beer festival. Dressed in lederhosen, the cast enter a tent and have a meal with beer before conversing about Korean culture with a lady from the United Kingdom. Ashminov and Okyere enjoy having meat at a stall, where Ashminov converses with a chef in Serbian. The day after, the friends travel to Cologne and visit the Cologne Cathedral, where they talk about the church's history and its significance within Germany during the World War II. As they enter inside the cathedral, the friends do a tour within, and Okyere has a conversation with a German woman inside the church. The episode ends with the cast looking at the view from the top of the architecture.
| 42 | "Germany" | December 2, 2015 | 3.3% |
The episode begins with the friends travelling to Lindemann's hometown, Langenfeld. Once arriving, Lindemann talks about the place where he had his first kiss as a child as well as pretending the play basketball with the friends. They then visit the St. Martin Church next to Lindemann's old elementary school where he performs songs on the organ. The cast then meet Lindemann's mother and stepfather, before meeting his stepsisters later on. Soon, they have dinner with the family, served with Caprese salad as an appetizer as well as discussing about his romantic past while served pasta with turkey cream. Okyere presents a shirt to Lindemann's stepfather as a gift to conclude the dinner. The next morning, the friends are served breakfast by the family. Outside his house, they have fun on a tricycle before meeting his friend Simon, who enters the scene with a sports car. After the meeting, the rest of the other friends try to ride the tricycle. Afterwards, they travel to the Michael Schumacher kart center in Kerpen, where they all do a race. Ashminov, Okyere and Williams bet on Mondi winning the race, and all the friends vote for Zhang as the loser. However, Simon wins with Lindemann in second place and Ashminov in third place. In the end, Lindemann converses with Simon about how he felt when Lindemann first left to Korea and how he thinks of him as a friend. The friends return to Langenfeld, this time to go waterskiing. They are joined by Lindemann's parents and reunited with Yoo, who is already waiting for them.
| 43 | "Germany" | December 9, 2015 | 2.9% |
The friends go waterskiing with Lindemann's parents nearby in Langenfeld. Yoo, Lindemann's mother and father have no trouble going water skiing, but the rest of the friends struggle to do so. Afterwards, the friends split, with Lindemann, Mondi, Williams, Okyere and Yoo heading to Leverkusen to meet an old friend of Lindemann's. On the other hand, Zhang and Ashminov head with Lindemann's mother to buy ingredients at a grocery store. Firstly, Lindemann's group visits his old friend, Sandra, who works as a radio DJ for the local radio station. Lindemann reveals that when he first met her in high school, he developed some feelings for her, to the surprise of the other friends. After a conversation, the radio broadcast featuring the friends begins recording, where the friends talks about life in Korea and about Germany, and the session is eventually broadcast a few days later. Meanwhile, Ashminov and Zhang are in Langenfeld with Lindemann's mother to buy food for dinner at Lindemann's maternal grandmother's house. Ashminov mentions in an interview that he wants to cook for the friends and the family, with a Bulgarian cuisine such as Shopska salad, salad with apple cider vinegar, as well as Polish potato pancakes and steak margrete. After buying supplies, Ashminov and Zhang greet Lindemann's grandmother, and start cooking dinner. Zhang struggles at first with the preparation, but eventually succeeds in making the meals for the friends. The friends arrive later and greet Lindemann's grandmother, and everyone eventually sits for dinner. The friends discuss about Lindemann's behavior as a child, where his mother states that he was "loud" in his youth. They also discuss about how Lindemann was born to a single mother and was raised mostly by his grandmother and how it affected his life. Finally, the episode ends with Lindemann's family performing a musical piece from Bach and Lindemann performing a duet with his mother.
| 44 | "Germany" | December 16, 2015 | 2.9% |
On their last day in Germany, the episode starts with Lindemann waking the next morning and having breakfast with his mother, his aunt and his grandmother. Soon after, he gives them presents from Korea, such as bags and coffee before reuniting with the friends, who say their goodbyes to the family and depart for Berlin, the capital. Their first destination in the city is the Holocaust Memorial, and the friends are surprised by the large size and mistook it as a graveyard at first. However, they learn of its significance before heading off to one of the city's most famous landmarks, the Brandenburg Gate. Lindemann explains how the landmark had been used as a border between East Germany and West Germany, and they were standing where it used to be the east. Afterwards, they visit the Berlin Wall, the city's most famous landmark. There, Ashminov explains how the division of Germany between communism and capitalism impacted on his life as he hailed from a former Communist country, Bulgaria. He additionally adds that he had served food to Mikhail Gorbachev and shook hands with Bill Clinton years ago. The cast also visit Checkpoint Charlie, formerly used by the United States Army during the Cold War and now used as a tourist attraction, before taking a photo with some soldiers at the checkpoint. Yoo, Ashminov, Zhang and Lindemann have some currywurst at a local food stall nearby, along with some beer. Meanwhile, Mondi, Okyere and Williams visits Berlin Cathedral and talk about its Baroque style architecture. When they enter inside the cathedral, they are amazed by its interiors. Mondi, Okyere and Williams also visit the Fernsehturm Berlin, Germany's tallest structure, as well as trying out a vintage Trabant and take their way around the city. The friends all reunite again and decide to ride a party bike, where they are able to have beer whilst pedaling. The episode ends with the friends having fun clubbing in Berlin, all successfully entering through inspection.
| 45 | "New Zealand" | December 23, 2015 | 2.7% |
The friends, Yoo, Patry, Zhang, Shakya and Terada meet outside the New Zealand embassy in Seoul a week before departing for the trip. They are then introduced to new cast member, singer Lee Jung. Afterwards, they then meet John Riley (who had been on the Canada trip) inside the embassy, who will be hosting the trip. They are also greeted by another ambassador of New Zealand, who briefly converses with Zhang in Chinese. The cast ask the ambassador about the weather in New Zealand, in which she replied that the weather is nice as it is early summer there. At the embassy, the friends are served some treats while they discuss about Riley's attitude towards the friends compared to his attitudes towards his fellow ambassadors, as well as learning "hello" and "good" in Māori. On the day of departure, the friends separate, with Riley, Lee Jung, Shakya and Terada grouped together to visit the southern part of New Zealand, particularly Queenstown, whereas Patry and Zhang will head to the north, visiting cities such as Auckland and Wellington. Riley's group departs first to Queenstown. After arriving at Queenstown Airport, the friends first make their way towards a cable car/gondola at Ben Lomond, where they can view the city from a high point. On the way up, the view different places such as The Remarkables and talk about the idea of "four seasons in one day". At the top of the mountain, they go bungee jumping that looks upon Lake Wakatipu. There, they meet a lady from the United Kingdom and ask her to judge their poses/jumps for each individual between the four friends, where the person with the worst pose has to jump into the waters of Lake Wakatipu. Riley goes first, and is then followed by Shakya, Terada and finally, Lee Jung. Terada makes an impressive backflip for his jump, in which the lady judges that Terada's jump was by far the best, and Riley's the worst. Afterwards, the friends go to the shore of the lake, where Riley and Shakya jump into the waters together despite the temperatures and have some burgers. On the other hand, Patry and Zhang depart for Auckland in the north, and head for an animal farm, where they learn how to milk cows and feed animals such as llamas, alpacas and the New Zealand animal, the emu. The episode ends with the two departing the farm.
| 46 | "New Zealand" | December 30, 2015 | 2.5% |
Riley, Lee Jung, Shakya and Terada visit Mount Cook (alternate name Aoraki) in the southern part of New Zealand. Riley then tells the friends that they will walk along the Tasman Glacier, the longest glacier in the country. Riley mentions that there are two ways to see the glacier, one by boat and the other through a helicopter. Shakya and Terada decide to go on the boat tour, whereas Riley and Lee Jung take the helicopter tour. Riley and Lee Jung go on the tour with a guide and are warned about the dangers of the glacier, such as sinkholes. However, the glacier they see is a lot smaller due to the effects of global warming, but is still big enough to be the largest in the Southern Hemisphere. They then land at the glacier, where they decide to go hiking. On the other hand, Shakya and Terada ride a shuttle bus to Mount Cook National Park to be able to ride the boat to the glacier. Shakya states that Lord of the Rings series was shot in the area as one of the main settings. They then hike to Tasman Valley, where during the trekking course they meet a guide, who leads them to Tasman Lake. There they ride a small boat where they find a few icebergs and try eating the ice. Patry and Zhang go to the city of Auckland and have lunch at a local restaurant. There, Patry mentions to Zhang about how the beef should be done, and they have a T-bone steak, filet mignon and steak with some vegetables too. Patry also mentions to Zhang about the differences between Korean meat and meat in New Zealand. Afterwards, they go for a city tour around the city, visiting Queen Street, in which Patry compares it to Hongdae in Seoul or Haeundae in Busan. They decide to go try out the reverse bungee, one of the city's hotspots. The rest of the friends make their way to Auckland to reunite with the two, where they entertain themselves with a new song in the car. The friends later arrive at the city, where they meet with Patry and Zhang at a restaurant. They are offered some white wine, oysters as an appetizer, served with yellowfin tuna, carpaccio, crayfish and other foods as the main courses. After their dinner, the friends arrive at their hotel. They have some free time in their hotel, such as looking around the gym and doing some exercises. The episode ends with Riley waking the friends up the next morning.
| 47 | "New Zealand" | January 6, 2016 | 2.3% |
The episode begins with Riley waking the friends up at 6 in the morning, first going to Zhang and Terada's room. He decides to wake the friends early for sports activities later in the day, and goes to Patry and Shakya's room afterwards. The friends go to Mission Bay, for some morning exercise. Riley also shows the friends a view of Rangitoto Island, New Zealand's largest volcano. Firstly, the friends go jogging but Riley pushes himself hard compared to the friends, who are still tired but they eventually try to run away from Riley, who keeps telling the friends that they should be working as one team. Afterwards, the friends rest for a bit whilst Riley sees Zhang trying to run away. As the oldest, Riley promised the friends that he would buy coffee for them, and went to do so while the friends waited for him. Lee Jung and the friends discuss about Riley's "energetic" behavior; Lee asks Patry, who has had a close friendship with Riley for 16 years, if he has been like this. After Patry responds that he has gotten "worse" after a trip to the United Kingdom, they all jokingly agree that he has started the "menopause" stage early. Riley returns early with the friends' coffee and their first activity of the day is the most popular sport in New Zealand, rugby. Riley mentions that a friend, who is a rugby player, will be joining them to play touch rugby. Finally, the friends meet a rugby team, consisting of Riley's friend and others, greeting them in the Maori traditional way. The friends learn of the rules first before they have some practice on passes. While practicing, the friends praise Terada for his amazing passes due to playing baseball as a child. The game begins and the friends have a game against the rugby players, who have beat them easily. After the game, the friends and the rugby players have some fish and chips together. Party asks the team captain who has played the best out of the friends, and captain chose Terada as the best. Lee Jung asks how Riley and his friend met, and Riley responded that they did the haka together. Riley and the rugby team perform a haka for the friends, who applaud them for the wonderful performance. The friends then go sailing on a yacht at Viaduct Harbour in Auckland, and the friends are planning to go sailing just around the area of the Auckland Harbour Bridge. Riley mentions of the sport's significance within New Zealand, and mentions that they will have a competition, with the punishment as bungee jumping from the Sky Tower, the tallest viewpoint in the city. At the port, they meet the instructors and are split into three teams, with Patry and Shakya together, Lee Jung and Terada, and Riley and Zhang. During the race, Patry asks his coach if he's been to Korea. The coach replies that he was the coach for the South Korean national sailing team at the 2010 Asian Games in Guangzhou, helping them win bronze. Riley and Zhang win the race, with Lee Jung and Terada and finally, Patry and Shakya in last place.
| 48 | "New Zealand" | January 13, 2016 | 2.7% |
The friends rest alongside the beach, where Lee Jung plays a song accompanied with a guitar and with the rest of the friends singing. Afterwards, in Auckland, the friends decide to go bungee jumping on the city's Sky Tower as a punishment for losing to the yacht race in the last episode. However, Riley changes the rules and decides that all the friends jump together. At the top, the friends enjoy the view before Patry jumps first. Lee Jung jumps afterwards, followed by Riley, Zhang, Terada and finally, Shakya. The friends finish jumping and leave to Riley's mother's house, within a neighbourhood in the city. They greet Riley's mother, whom Riley hadn't seen in a year and eight months. She surprises the friends when she says she knows Shakya from one of the Canada episodes, and Lee Jung, whom she mentions saw him sing on King of Mask Singer back in South Korea. In the house, Riley's mother gives the friends a tour of the house, especially the Maori kete that hangs on the walls, and explains its significance. The friends also have a look at old childhood photos of Riley. After having a toast with Riley's mother and an old family friend of Riley's, he explains that his two older sisters live in France and Japan respectively. Terada asks Riley's mother if she likes Japanese men, but only mentions about her son-in-law but cheers him up by saying she likes Terada too. The friends then ask about Riley's life, especially about his energetic characteristic, in which Riley's mother mentions was not true in his youth. Soon afterwards, more family friends arrive at the house to visit Riley and the friends. Riley mentions that his mother had met her friends at a Maori club. Riley mentions that he is of Maori descent and talks about his heritage before performing a traditional Maori dance with his mother and a few of the family friends. In return, the friends sing Arirang, Korea's most famous traditional folk song, and are greeted with a positive response. Riley's mother and the family friends sing Pokarekare Ana, a famous New Zealand love song that is recognised in Korea after New Zealand soldiers introduced the song while fighting in the Korean War. After their performance, the friends are served green-lipped mussel as an appetiser for dinner, before Riley's mother asks Shakya and Terada to help her out in the kitchen. The friends ask what their Māori names should be and after dinner, the friends prepare to sleep. The morning after, the friends head to Rotorua, where they will visit a Maori camp as well as spending some time in a mud bath. There, they visit Tikitere, also known as "Hell's Gate", Rotorua's most active geothermal area. They enter a forest within the area, where they see hot springs and warm waterfalls. The episode ends when they enter a mud bath and do Māori poses and learning the haka.
| 49 | "New Zealand" | January 20, 2016 | 2.0% |
The first activity the friends head to in Rotorua is a Maori village. When entering the village, the friends are greeted by a Maori woman in pōwhiri, a Maori welcoming ceremonial greeting. At the welcoming ceremony, Riley and Lee Jung decide to sing "Pokarekare Ana" to the tribe, before all the friends are each given tribal outfits such as the korowai. They then head to the forest near the village and learn to do the haka, the famous war dance of the Maori people. The friends ask the tribe to pick whom out of the cast has done the best haka, and they pick Lee Jung, to Riley's shock. The next activity the friends play is called "Maui and Matau", where they have to change either to the left or right direction when it is being called out, while holding a stick. If the person fails to hold the stick while changing position, they lose. Zhang loses on the first go, followed by Lee Jung. Patry wins against Shakya and the friends move on to the second game which is called "poi", that practices wrist flexibility. They are then tested on their stamina and athleticism in another game, in which Riley gets hit as a punishment for being the worst at it. Afterwards, the friends have some lunch, served with meat that has been cooked in a traditional Māori style. After lunch, the friends watch a performance in a packed theatre and they learn the story of the song "Pokarekare Ana", and Lee Jung is surprised by the singing skills of the performers, where after the show, the friends stay behind and discuss about how the day went for them. The next day, back at Riley's mother's house, Riley wakes up the cast one by one for some morning exercise. Patry and Zhang follow Riley's mother to the plants by the house to pick some grapefruit, lemons and rhubarb for breakfast. In the meantime, Lee Jung and Terada come out and have a taste of the lemons, which is too sour for them. Riley and Shakya join into the scene with some equipment for exercise, such as some dumbbells. Whilst the others begin their morning exercise, Riley's mother chooses Shakya and Terada to help her make some breakfast for the friends. The friends have some stewed rhubarb with some bread, oatmeal and fruit juice. The friends decide for Riley to spend some time with his mother whilst the rest of the friends stay in the house to clean up. Lee Jung plays the piano in the house and sings Michael Jackson's "Love Never Felt So Good" with Patry and Zhang. They have some trouble getting the notes right before Lee Jung gives up on it. Whilst the friends are in the house, Riley and his mother take a walk nearby where they discuss about health and the amount of time they have together. Riley is worried about his mother's health and also discusses about work as well. Before the friends leave, Lee Jung sings one of his songs, "Do It Tomorrow" to Riley's mother as a farewell gift, after she requests him to sing personally to her since watching him on King of Mask Singer. The episode ends with Riley and Patry travelling to Taupō and Zhang, Shakya and Terada heading to Hobbiton.
| 50 | "New Zealand" | January 27, 2016 | 2.2% |
The first place the show introduces to in this episode follows Zhang, Shakya and Terada to Hobbiton in Waikato, the setting for the movie series The Lord of the Rings, based on the novel of the same name by J. R. R. Tolkien. Firstly, the friends encounter a farm on the set, where it is revealed that the farm was used as a setting in the movies. They are greeted by a female guide and see the Hobbit village that features in the movies, before Zhang disguises as Gandalf with a beard and wig. Afterwards the friends encounter a cat that starts to follow them. Whilst around the set, Terada mentions that he would like to film a music video around the area one day due to the weather and nature of the setting. With the help of Zhang and Shakya, he then reenacts one of his songs and dances as if he was in a music video. The friends then find a wide space and have some fun, since they finally have a "relaxing" day without Riley. Afterwards, the friends encounter the home of Bilbo Baggins, one of the series' most famous characters. They enter inside and see that there is no one inside, and the guide explains that they film the scenes separately in a studio instead, disappointing Zhang, who is dressed as Gandalf. Afterwards, the friends have lunch, before they seek the synonymous ring of the series at a gift store, and purchase one using Zhang's credit card. Then, Terada's music video is presented, featuring Zhang and Shakya. On the other hand, in Taupō, Riley and Patry walk alongside the largest lake in New Zealand, Lake Taupō. Here, Riley talks about the Maori mythology, between three mountains: Mount Tongariro, Mount Taranaki and Mount Pihanga, also known as the Mount Taranaki legend. Tongariro and Taranaki fought for the latter, which was said to be the "female mountain". He mentions that Tongariro wins and that the position of Mount Taranaki had become Lake Taupō after it lost, therefore moving to the west coast of the North Island. They then decide to go play golf by the lake, where they try to get a hole in one. Party tries to teach Riley how to properly swing but gives up before demonstrating it himself to try to get the hole, which he barely misses. After 20 tries, the two keep failing to get the goal and decide to try harder the last five balls. Riley finally manages to get close to the hole, but still misses, and Patry tries as well but also fails. Riley and Patry have a conversation about marriage, where Patry asks for advice from Riley, who has been married for eleven years. He mentions that fighting will be common due to reasons such as money and family, and that if Patry had thought about marriage, then his life as a celebrity would have to be over since it would just damage the relationship. In summary, Riley advises to do the right decisions which the individual believes is the most safe. Afterwards, the friends all reunite on the Coromandel Peninsula in the north, where they come across Hot Water Beach, where it is self-explanatory: if digging sand, hot water will come out. The friends decide to have a go at digging, in which Riley and Patry go together, and Zhang, Shakya and Terada digging together. On one hand, the friends altogether try to create a spring for themselves before it gets washed away by the waves, therefore the friends just give up and relax. After the time at the beach, the friends return to Riley's mother's house, where they are greeted by more family members, such as Riley's two uncles and aunt. Patry talks about how he and Riley first met over ten years ago and how they have been friends ever since. The friends are surprised at Zhang's improved English skills and praise him, before Riley asks his mother to show the friends of "Poi", the activity the friends had done the day before in the Maori village. She, along with Riley's aunt perform for the friends, who are intrigued. Riley's aunt asks for the friends to exercise with her, where they do movements to Psy's Gangnam Style. As a parting gift, Riley gives his mother a new smartphone, as she has been using an old phone for 14 years, as well as Riley paying for her phone bills. The other friends also have gifts, where Patry writes a letter to her and Riley and reads it aloud to them. After the conversation, Riley thanks the friends one by one, even Lee Jung, who had departed early due to his busy schedule. They finish off with Riley singing a song, g.o.d's "Road".
| 51 | "South Korea (Jeju Island)" | February 3, 2016 | 2.4% |
Yoo, Patry, Mondi and Zhang meet at Gimpo International Airport to board the plane to their next destination, Jeju Island. After arriving at Jeju International Airport, they are greeted by the rain but Yoo has already rented a convertible. The friends then take a trip alongside the Jeju Olle Trail, a road/path alongside the coast of the island. The four friends split, with Yoo and Zhang walking together, while Patry and Mondi stick together. Zhang and Mondi walk together and Mondi shows Patry that the ribbons on the trail show that they are walking the right path, before taking a photo of the sunset. They then both enter a small church throughout the end of the trail, where Patry learns about Andrew Kim Taegon, Korea's first Catholic priest and patron saint. On the other hand, Yoo and Zhang have some coffee on another trail when they encounter the film setting for famous Korean drama, Dae Jang Geum. Zhang mentions how famous the drama is in China, and decides to intimate actress Lee Young-ae's expression in the photograph. Also, they make different expressions on the trail before dusk falls upon the island. The friends reunite soon afterwards and enter a pension to stay in for the night, where they are greeted by the owners of the house and their friends, where they all decide to have dinner altogether. Whilst waiting for dinner, Yoo views the advertisement Patry, Mondi and Zhang were in, promoting a heated mat a year ago. Just after, the owners and their friends arrive and have dinner with local foods. The locals state that they decided to move to the island after the beautiful views and atmosphere, but state that there are a lot of bugs around. The friends joke that Zhang eats bugs (a common food in China) but he confesses that the bugs are only sold for foreigners, much to the friends' shock. The morning after, Lee Jung waits for the friends by one of the island's most famous restaurants, and first meets Ashminov. Ashminov doesn't know Lee Jung very well and believes that he is an actor instead of a singer. Not long after, the four friends Yoo, Patry, Mondi and Zhang arrive at the restaurant and are reunited with Lee Jung and Ashminov. There, they have breakfast and learn some Jeju language such as "Have a great meal" and "More please". Finally, the friends visit a beach nearby, where they pose by a statue of a Korean woman and try to walk along the beach before the water starts to go towards them. However, they decide to play a small game of rock-paper-scissors, where the one who loses will take their shoes off and put their feet in the water, despite the cold. All the friends win but Mondi, who does so but rushes back quickly when a wave starts coming towards him. The episode ends with the friends walking alongside the trail on the coast.
| 52 | "South Korea (Jeju Island)" | February 10, 2016 | 2.4% |
The episode begins with the friends visiting a tangerine field not too far from the restaurant where the friends reunited. They are greeted by the farmers of the field who have worked for over twenty years. At the farm, they are taught how to harvest the oranges before Yoo tries an orange, where he is very content with its honey-like taste. Before they get to work, the friends are taught by the farmer how to find a good orange, in which they learn that a good orange has to have a round shape, size of around 5 to 6 cm, and with a grainy-like surface. Lee Jung finds a pile of oranges together, and jokes that it is a studio microphone by singing Adele's "Hello", to the friends' delight. Afterwards, all the friends finish and they have some food, such as sweet potato, the oranges they harvested and some noodles. Afterwards, the friends split, with Yoo, Zhang and Patry together to ride ATV in the mountains, while Lee Jung, Ashminov and Mondi take to the ocean to go scuba diving despite the cold weather. Firstly, Lee Jung and co. meet a local diver who has worked in the profession for over forty years. The three then learn the instructions of scuba diving, such as breathing. They then enter the water and enjoy the experience, as well as examining the corals near the coast. Unfortunately for them, they finished quickly and decides to get some food, where Ashminov cooks ramen with octopus for the friends, as well as for the diver. On the other hand, Yoo and co. head to the mountains, where they enter an ATV course, which is quite common in Jeju Island. They ride on the course and have some fun, despite Zhang struggling to drive as fast as Yoo and Patry. However, the friends get soaked in mud, due to the cold and damp weather on the island. They finish soon after, and all the friends reunite to travel to Lee Jung's house. They are given a tour of the house, and in the music room on the second floor, the friends all perform in a competition, with Yoo singing "Hello" by Adele, Ashminov singing "Breaking the Law" by Judas Priest, Mondi singing a rap song, Zhang doing a lip sync of Vitas' "Opera #2" with Yoo in a duet, and finally Patry doing a talent show along with the friends to the background of "My Heart Will Go On" by Celine Dion. Party, Ashminov and Mondi win first, second and third respectively, winning meat, rice cake and a box of oranges as prizes for each position. Afterwards, Yoo and Patry mention that they have schedules the day after and may or may not make it in time for filming. The episode ends the next morning, introducing secret members of the trip, recurring member John Riley and first time on the show, comedian Jang Dong-min.
| 53 | "South Korea (Jeju Island)" | February 21, 2016 | 1.2% |
Riley and Jang Dong-min enter Lee Jung's house in the morning, surprising Mondi and Zhang while they are sleeping. Riley asks for a morning exercise, in which Mondi agrees to do, but Jang and Zhang are reluctant to do so. Riley and Jang also wake Ashminov and Lee Jung, who is happy to see Riley once again. Riley, Lee Jung, Mondi and Zhang do exercises together outside despite the cold weather. While the friends have breakfast, they separate into two teams, with Riley, Lee Jung and Mondi together on a nature tour, whilst Jang, Ashminov and Zhang have a food tour on the island. On one hand, the friends on the food tour arrive at a famous restaurant and have a "wellbeing soup", named due to its healthy ingredients. Jang teaches Ashminov and Zhang how to do face gags for humor while in the restaurant. On the other hand, Riley, Lee Jung and Mondi climb Saebyeol Oreum, a hill on Jeju. There, they take photos along the reeds as well as viewing the island from the top. The friends on the food tour then visit the Jeju Folk Village Museum, another site of the famous drama Dae Jang Geum, which Ashminov states he has never watched. There, they are escorted around the site by a tour guide whilst learning some phrases in Jeju dialect. They also pretend to reenact nobles from the past whilst touring before heading for lunch. Riley, Lee Jung and Mondi arrive at a maze where they decide to play a game of hide-and-seek in the maze, with Riley being the one who has to catch the other two. Eventually, Riley manages to find the other two just before the exit of the maze.
| 54 | "South Korea (Jeju Island)" | February 28, 2016 | 1.2% |
The episode begins with Riley, Lee Jung and Mondi visiting a fisherman's house in the night, who also own a guesthouse for the friends. They are shocked to see Patry is already there waiting for them, after returning from his schedule. They work with some of the locals on picking vegetables before Jang, Ashminov and Zhang arrive soon afterward. The friends then have dinner from the seafood the fishermen and women had caught earlier. The friends then share bedrooms, with Riley, Mondi and Zhang sharing a room together, and Jang, Lee Jung, Ashminov and Patry sharing the other. The friends are seen resting in the living room of the house, when the owner enters with some foods for them to enjoy. Whilst they are enjoying some free time, they are distracted by the sound of hail outside. All the other friends then decide to go have a look along with the locals, and one of them decides to make Hallasan, Jeju's mountain using the hailstones. Ashminov has some soju with some of the hailstones as ice in one shot, much to his pleasure. The morning after, the friends decide to go fishing with the locals and reunite with Yoo. On the shores they all have a go at fishing one by one, but the hail comes back and the activity postpones due to the strong weather. As the friends dry up, Lee Jung brings some anchovy rice balls as lunch for the friends with some soup as well. After the lunch, the friends arrive at a town in the southeast of the island in Seongsan-eup where it is famous for its murals around the town. Lee Jung then decides that the friends go visit a local school. The friends visit an elementary school, where they meet a fourth grade (Korean system) teacher who guides them around the campus. They meet third grade students and the friends introduce themselves one by one. One student recognises Patry as he wanted to become a professional gamer just like him, and asks for some advice. Yoo, Riley, Ashminov, Patry and Zhang stay in the classroom and talk to the students about their dream professions, such as gamers and chefs, talking about how it can be difficult experience it but can be enjoyable at the same time. On the other hand, Jang, Lee Jung and Mondi do some dodgeball with the children. Back at Lee Jung's house, the friends are given some brown clothing worn only on the island, and Lee Jung tells the friends that he decides to make a song for them with the help of Yoo and Jang, who are making the lyrics. The episode ends with the friends singing the song.
| 55 | "Thailand" | March 6, 2016 | 1.6% |
Yoo and Mondi meet with Ashminov in a restaurant in Seoul before new cast member Andreas Varsakopoulos of Greece enters. After Ashminov and Varsakopoulos decide that it isn't the best time to visit Bulgaria and Greece, Yoo decides to call GOT7's Jackson Wang from China, and ask whether the friends could go to fellow GOT7 member BamBam's home country of Thailand. They then agree to meet later after lunch. Later, at the JYP building, they all meet and agree to go to Thailand, as well as having a brief phone conversation with BamBam's mother and talk about his family as well. The friends arrive in Bangkok and are greeted by hundreds of GOT7 Thai fans at the terminal before their next flight to Chiang Rai in the north, which is famous for its coffee. At the airport, they arrive only to be greeted by more fans before heading off to the night bazaar. At the night market, the friends divide up into two teams, with Ashminov and BamBam together in one team and Mondi, Varsakopoulos and Jackson together in another, and they all buy some clothing in the market. Ashminov and BamBam try out some traditional Thai food nearby as well as smoothies and some fried insects. On the other hand, Varsakopoulos does some tarot card reading. The friends then reunite at a restaurant where they show each other some of the street food. They all try the insects, which is delicious to their surprise. They also have horse urine (in egg) and fried noodles for dinner. At the hotel, the friends to some exercises and mess around. The next morning, the friends travel to the border between Thailand and Myanmar/Burma up north. The episode ends with the friends viewing the view by the border.
| 56 | "Thailand" | March 13, 2016 | 1.5% |
The friends travel to an ethnic minority village in the north, where they go try some local coffee that is famous in Thailand. They also learn of some of the local traditions in the village and are also given some clothing worn by the people in the village. All the friends are very happy with the taste of the coffee and also try to learn of Varsakopoulos' future from his coffee cup. They then head off to greet children at a school nearby, where they introduce themselves one by one and learn of the cheek kiss, the European greeting style. They also watch a performance of Jackson and BamBam dancing as well as the children singing a Thai folk song. The friends give them presents from Korea, such as bags and sweets before heading off for lunch with the kids. Afterwards, the friends have fun with the children in the playground. Mondi, Varsakopoulos and Jackson head off to the village with some locals and talk about how the coffee is created in the village, whilst conversing in Thai, Chinese, Korean and English simultaneously. The three friends even have a go at how it is made. On the other hand, Ashminov and BamBam head over to the market, where they buy some ingredients such as hibiscus, cabbage and onion as well as trying some passionfruit. Back at the village, the two friends head to a kitchen where Ashminov cooks with some locals whilst BamBam sets the tables for the other friends, and Jackson and co. create a campfire outside. At dinner time, many of the villagers come over and have dinner with the friends outside. They are also treated with a local performance in which they join in as well before performing for the locals. The friends then leave the village and head back towards their hotel in the city, where they exercise and order room service before heading to sleep.
| 57 | "Thailand" | March 20, 2016 | 1.5% |
The episode begins with the friends leaving from the city of Chiang Mai to an elephant care center nearby. BamBam tells the friends that they won't be riding the elephants but will be caring for them instead. At the center, they change into clothing that would be suitable for the elephants, and move to the area where the elephants eat. Mondi, Jackson and BamBam have a go at feeding an elephant with some plants before heading over with the elephant to the lake where it is drinking. On the other hand, Ashminov and Varsakopoulos look at the medicine for the elephants, and use it on themselves after hearing that it is good for people too. They observe how the medicine is put on the skin of the elephant and try themselves as well. The other three friends walk with the elephant they had just fed to a nearby lake for cleaning, and learn commands in Thai for the elephant. At the nearby lake, all the friends join together to wash the elephant, before being soaked by the elephant itself. The friends then leave Chiang Mai and travel to the capital and BamBam's hometown, Bangkok. The first place they travel to is the house BamBam had bought for his mother, meeting Yoo, who is already waiting for them and BamBam's mother, younger sister Baby and older brother Beer. BamBam's mother compliments the friends and their looks, especially being very interested in Varsakopoulos' muscles. They also have a tour of the house and make impressions on the family. Afterwards, they have Thai cuisine made by BamBam's mother, such as fried seafood with basil, duck, fried chicken with cashew nuts, tofu soup and green curry. They then enjoy the dinner with the family, and learn how BamBam's mother owns Korean restaurants in Bangkok. They also talk about BamBam's childhood, his life in Korea and his evolution into a GOT7 member at the dinner table. His mother also gifts the friends with pants before they head over to sleep. The next morning, BamBam and his mother have a date together to get some breakfast for the friends at a market. At the market, people all stop while the Thai national anthem plays, which has been a daily pastime for the Thai people. Back at the house, they bring all the food needed for breakfast and the friends have breakfast together before they all head together to a temple nearby to pay respects to BamBam's late father. At the temple, they give gifts to a Buddhist monk and pray using candles, oil and gold.
| 58 | "Thailand" | March 27, 2016 | 1.3% |
In Bangkok, the friends make their way to a Muay Thai training center and have a go at learning the sport themselves. There, they meet Thailand's current champion and coach and learn basic punches from them. The friends divide themselves into the Asian team consisting of Yoo, Jackson and BamBam and the European team with Ashminov, Mondi and Varsakopoulos. The friends all train using the punching bag as well as learning kick techniques. The friends watch a match between the champion and another fighter to get an idea of how the matches are being done, and learn defensive moves in the ring. The champion and coach pick Jackson as the best fighter, while Ashminov was chosen as the worst. After their exercise, the friends travel to the river in Bangkok and board a boat for dinner with BamBam's family already waiting aboard. There, they have seafood such as shrimp as their main course and tom yum. During dinner, Yoo tells Jackson the friends will be travelling to an island the day after, unfortunately Jackson cannot make it as he has to fly back to South Korea due to scheduling conflicts. At dinner everyone is entertained by the dancers and the friends join in the dance as well. BamBam's mother also joins in the dancing as well. The friends also visit Khaosan Road, one of the most famous districts in the city. The friends separate, with Ashminov and Mondi, Yoo and Varsakopoulos while Jackson and BamBam go around with BamBam's mother. There, the friends try street food such as tarantula, dance with other foreigners, braid their hair, have some thai massage and go shopping. BamBam states that while many foreigners see places such as Phuket and Pattaya as ideal places to go on holiday, he took the friends to Krabi instead. The next day, the friends arrive at their resort hotel on the island and check in before they board a boat to the ocean nearby. They encounter "chicken islands" and "turtle islands" before arrive at their place to climb up the cliff on one of the islands and then go diving. The friends enter the water one by one before they dive from the cliff. The European friends help BamBam climb the ladder to fulfil his wish list of diving from the cliff. The friends also go to the shore and have fun before heading to Railay Beach to tan, play ball and have fun in the water with other foreigners in the area. The final episode of the Thailand trip ends with the friends going rock climbing on the beach.
| 59 | "United States" | April 8, 2016 | 1.0% |
The first episode of the trip to the United States introduces the four friends, Yoo, Patry, Rasch and new cast member Nikolai Johnsen. The show also features some home videos of Rasch's childhood. Patry first meets Rasch at the latter's home in Seoul, where they cook some food and discuss where they will be going. Later, the friends meet up at the airport and fly to John F. Kennedy International Airport in New York City, their first destination. In NYC, the friends go to Madison Square to buy some lunch at a fast casual restaurant, with foods such as hamburger, French fries and milkshakes. After lunch, the friends visit Rockefeller Center in Midtown Manhattan, where it is famous for its Christmas tree. Afterwards, the friends then make their way to the observation deck at the top of the center, the Top of the Rock and observe the famous skyline of the city, looking over Empire State Building and the Chrysler Building. The friends make their way down to the plaza and go ice skating at the ice rink where they teach Johnsen how to skate. The friends divide into two groups, with Patry and Rasch going together, whilst Yoo and Johnsen make their way to buy some sausages for the friends. The latter two try their luck at a lottery scratchcard and manage to win some money a few times before having a massage and a manicure at a beauty salon. Patry and Rasch on the other hand, go on a helicopter tour of the city, which was something Rasch had wanted to do since youth. They fly over Lower Manhattan and Liberty Island, the location of the Statue of Liberty. The friends then reunite at a steakhouse restaurant for dinner and meet Rasch's older sister, brother-in-law and nephew. There, the friends and Rasch's sister talked about their Rasch's intelligence, life in Korea and their brother-sister relationship.
| 60 | "United States" | April 15, 2016 | 1.4% |
Rasch and the friends travel to Somerset, Massachusetts from New York to visit Rasch's mother and grandmother. Rasch's mother gives golf caps and cowboy boots for the friends as well as a copy of the Bill of Rights. The friends also enjoy a piano performance from Rasch's grandmother and ask about whether Rasch's intelligence was from his family. To the friends' shock, they find out that Rasch had been smart from the age of 18 months, and also discussed about Rasch's youth. Afterwards, the friends help Rasch's family prepare a meal, which is soup and bread Portuguese style. Afterwards, the friends decide to learn some golf from Rasch's mother and her boyfriend, who are both professional golfers in the PGA and LPGA and learn how to putter. Unfortunately, the friends had to leave after a short time with the family and go to visit Rasch's high school The Putney School in his home state, Vermont. There, they visit Rasch's old teacher, look at his grades and learn about the school's system, which is different from majority of schools in America. The friends then have a tour of the school, looking through the buildings of different faculties. They meet some dance students, which also consist of Korean students who recognised the friends from Non-Summit and the show itself. They then visit the barn on the campus and learn how to clean the cows. The friends had learned methods to remove excretion in the barn and feed the cows. They then have food with the Korean students at the school's cafeteria, where the food and cleaning provided was made by the students as one of their courses. They also meet many of Rasch's old friends and colleagues at the school before leaving. They then visit Rasch's father and uncle in the countryside and have some more Portuguese foods, such as caldo verde and quiche. Rasch's father interrogates the friends about the show Non-Summit and had asked the reason why the foreigners had decided to live in South Korea and how they're excellent at languages. They ask Rasch's father about his son's intelligence, knowledge and how Rasch and his sister had been educated. They also have a look at Rasch's paintings from his youth. Later on, Rasch and his father have some time together and Rasch gifts his father with his most recent paintings. The episode ends with the friends spending the night at Rasch's father's place. The morning after, they have an early breakfast before they depart for the West Coast.
| 61 | "United States" | April 22, 2016 | 1.0% |
The friends are in Los Angeles in California. Yoo and Johnson arrive at a hamburger store to see the difference between burgers in the West Coast and in the East Coast. They re-enact Hollywood scenes in the restaurant while waiting for the food. They also talk about the movies they enjoy, whether from Western cinema or Korean cinema. On the other hand, Patry and Rasch visit Venice Beach. Party goes swimming into the ocean and tries to get Rasch to get into the water as well before heading off to Muscle Beach, famous for its many bodybuilding centers, hence the name. Here, the two friends try some exercise with the help of two bodybuilders before meeting Korean comedian and exercise with him as well. Meanwhile, Yoo and Johnsen head off to Hollywood, where they first walk along the Hollywood Walk of Fame and encounter the Dolby Theatre, the location of the Academy Awards. They return to the Walk of Fame and look at the stars of Steven Spielberg, Jamie Foxx, Nicole Kidman and others. They interact with Spider-Man before walking past the TCL Chinese Theatre, and looking at the famous handprints in front of it. Yoo later dresses up as Marilyn Monroe whereas Johnsen dresses up as Elsa from "Frozen" and walk around Hollywood. Later, the friends reunite at Universal Studios Hollywood and have a tram tour in the park, touring around film locations. On the tour, they encounter cars from Back To The Future and The Fast and the Furious, enter Jurassic Park and more. The episode ends with the friends creating parodies of zombie apocalypse films.
| 62 | "United States" | April 29, 2016 | % |
At Universal Studios, the friends try some skydiving experience before they exit the amusement park. Yoo leaves the friends first from the studios. The friends leave the studios and leave Los Angeles, heading off to Death Valley, America's hottest and biggest desert, for the night. The morning after, the friends decide to rent a car and go on a tour of the valley. They first arrive at Badwater Basin, an oasis in the valley. They talk about how the valley is under sea level before Johnsen tries some of the salt at the basin. They then leave the valley and head over to their next destination, Artist's Drive and Palette, where the rocks have different colours. They enjoy the views in the area and continue their zombie apocalypse film. Before leaving to their third and final destination, they decide to stop by and look at the flowers on the way that have bloomed for the first time in over ten years. They head over to Ubehebe Crater, one of the most famous landmarks in the valley. They enjoy the views by the base of the crater and lie down to reminiscence their time in America as this was the last place they visit in the U.S. before heading back to Korea. To commemorate the end of Season 1 of the show, all friends from the thirteen trips (sans Lindemann, Hooper and Varsakopoulos) reunite at a restaurant back in Seoul and highlight the best memories from the trips over the last year.
