= Rashmila Shakya =

Nepalese writer, software engineer (born 1980)

Rashmila Shakya (born 1980) is a Nepalese writer, software engineer, and Programme Director for Child Workers in Nepal. She authored the autobiography From Goddess to Mortal: the True Life Story of a Former Royal Kumari, which documents her time as Royal Kumari of Kathmandu.

== Biography ==
She was recognized as the living reincarnation of the goddess Taleju when she was four years old. She served as the Royal Kumari from 1984 until 1991. She wrote the autobiography to change perceptions about the Kumari and raise awareness about the experiences of young girls who are chosen as the living Hindu goddesses. In her book she critiques the lack of education received by Kumaris and describes the challenges they face when returning to school and society after their time as Kumari has ended.

On 2 October 2015, Shakya, along with former Kumaris Nanimaiya Shakya, Sunina Shakya, Anita Shakya, Amita Shakya and Priti Shakya, was given money and acknowledgments for her contributions to culture and religion by Rudra Singh Tamang, the chief executive officer of Kathmandu Metropolitan City. Shakya believes the Kumari tradition is culturally important. Shakya is married, despite the superstitions surrounding Kumari and marriage.

== See also ==
- Shanti Malla, first female civil engineer of Nepal.
