= Dhana Kumari Bajracharya =

Nepalese Kumari

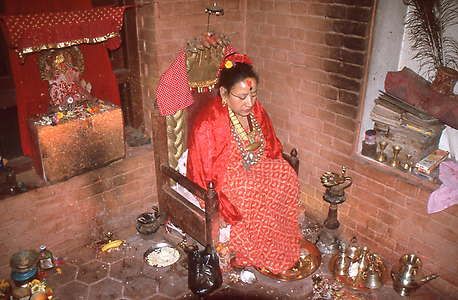
Oldest living Kumari sits in her throne.

Dhana Kumari Bajracharya is a Nepalese Kumari, and the former Kumari of Patan. Kumaris are prepubescent girls worshipped in Asian religious traditions as manifestations of female divine energy. Bajracharya was chosen as the official Kumari of the city of Patan in 1954, when she was 2 years old. She was supposed to leave her position after her first menstruation, however it never came.

Bajracharya reigned as Kumari of Patan for three decades until she was replaced against her will in 1984 by instructions of Crown Prince Dipendra.

Trying to find a reason to dethrone the then 30-year-old, priests summoned her to the temple for inspection to see if she still had Taleju's energy. They could find no marks to disqualify her, no marks of bleeding, because she has never menstruated. All they could find was a slight scratch on her ear. For this they said she could no longer reign.

It is said that the priest who wanted Bajracharya's Kumari pension to be cancelled died suddenly and unexpectedly. The natives of Patan believe that the priest was punished by the gods for this illegal cancellation of her Kumari pension.

She chose to continue living as a Kumari, staying in seclusion and never walking in public until the April 2015 Nepal earthquake, when she had to go out of her house on foot for the first time.

The natives still consider her to be holy.
