= Living Goddess (film) =

- Original movie poster
- Directed by: Ishbel Whitaker
- Cinematography: Marc Hawker
- Music by: Nitin Sawhney
- Distributed by: Forward Entertainment LLC (2007)
- Release date: 10 May 2008 (Planete Doc Review)
- Running time: 87 minutes
- Language: English

Living Goddess is a 2008 film that documents lives of three young Kumaris (prepubescent girls believed to be living goddesses) against the backdrop of the Nepalese Civil War. This film caused controversy at the time of its release, mostly due to the ritual sacrifice of 108 buffaloes and goats recorded in detail during the opening scene.

Premiered at Silverdocs, the AFI/Discovery Channel Documentary Festival in Downtown Silver Spring.

== Production ==
Living Goddess was produced by Ishbel Whitaker, Marc Hawker, and Andrew Curtis. Whitaker directed the film, while her husband Hawker was the cinemtographer. Filming took place between 2005 and 2006.

== Controversy ==
On 3 July 2008, Sajani Shakya was removed from her position as Kumari of Bhaktapur after visiting the United States to attend the release of the movie Living Goddess at Silverdocs, the American Film Institute/Discovery Channel documentary festival in downtown Silver Spring, Maryland. The visit, according to the elders, had tainted her purity. A couple of weeks later, temple authorities at Sajani Shakya's hometown recanted their previous statement and said that she would not be stripped of her title because she was willing to undergo a "cleansing" ceremony to remove any sins she might have committed while traveling.

== Reception ==
P. Hall of Video Librarian wrote, "Brilliantly filmed under fairly difficult circumstances, Living Goddess will definitely appeal to anyone with an interest in Eastern religions." In a positive review, Oxford University professor David Gellner stated, "The film is beautifully shot and the juxtaposition of the violence of animal sacrifice and the violence of political protests is very effective."
