= Samita Bajracharya =

Former Kumari of Patan

Samita Bajracharya is a Nepalese former Kumari of Patan, a living goddess worshipped by Hindus and Buddhists all over South Asia. She was believed to be a reincarnation of Durga, the Hindu goddess, and was one of several holders of the title of Kumari. Appointed in October 2010, she lived in Lalitpur, Nepal, and as per tradition, continued in her role until she first menstruated in 2014. In early 2014, upon reaching puberty, she undertook a ritual involving untying her hair and removing her third eye, after which she was no longer considered a goddess. As a Kumari, she was considered omniscient and thus not educated. She was not allowed to walk anywhere—her feet could not touch the ground. After becoming 'mortal' i.e. after her tenure as a Kumari, she was able to integrate in society, beginning school, walking and learning an instrument. By 2014 she was attending St Xavier School in Patan as a conventional 13-year-old student, allowed to mix socially with classmates with almost no trace of her former role crossing over into her post-Kumari life.
