= Charya dance =

Dance of Nepal

Charya dance is a traditional Buddhist ritual dance that originated in the Newar Buddhist community of Nepal. Once performed in secret, this dance is considered both a spiritual discipline and a form of devotion. Historically, it was believed that the gods would be so moved by the skill of the performers that they would manifest before the dancers. It is performed by Newar Buddhist priests, specifically Bajracharyas and Shakyas, Charya Nritya who perform the dance accompanied by Charya Giti, a kind of devotional songs.

The dance is characterized by its depiction of various Buddhist deities, including Manjushree, Avalokiteshvara, Vajrayogini, and Vajrapani. Each style of the dance is designed to reflect the appearance, ornaments, and inner qualities of the deity, aligning with the Vajrayana Buddhist practice of deity yoga, where the dancer visualizes themselves as the deity. This form of spiritual visualization fosters the embodiment of the deity’s virtues and awareness during the performance.

== Dance ==
The dance is typically accompanied by traditional instruments such as small Ta and a Damaru.

Dancers wear elaborate costumes and adorn themselves with six types of ornaments, adding to the spiritual and ceremonial atmosphere. The performance involves graceful movements and specific poses, many of which are inspired by the iconic postures seen in Buddhist deity figurines. These poses are held for varying durations, symbolizing the divine qualities of the deities being portrayed.

== See also ==
- Dance in Nepal
- Classes of Tantra in Tibetan Buddhism
