= Shanti Malla =

First female civil engineer of Nepal

- Born: Nepal
- Education: Jadavpur University
- Occupation: Civil engineer
- Known for: First female civil engineer of Nepal

Shanti Malla (Nepali: शान्ति मल्ल) is a Nepalese civil engineer recognized as the first woman from Nepal to earn a degree in civil engineering.

== Biography ==
Malla was born on 2001BS in Khamtol of Bhaktapur. She pursued higher education in engineering and enrolled at Jadavpur University in Kolkata, India. In 1966, she graduated with a Bachelor of Engineering (B.E.) degree in civil engineering from Jadavpur University in India.

Upon completing her degree, Malla returned to Nepal and began her career in civil engineering. Her educational achievement marked a breakthrough for gender representation in Nepal’s technical fields, paving the way for future generations of female engineers. As the first Nepalese woman to hold such a credential, she became a role model in a traditionally male‑dominant profession.

== Legacy ==
Her design includes the building of Agriculture Development Bank at Ram Shah Path, National Computer center and Tax office of Babarmahal. Shanti Malla remains an inspiring figure in Nepal’s engineering and academic communities. Her pioneering accomplishment emphasized the importance of women’s access to STEM education and professional opportunities in Nepal.

== See also ==
- Women in engineering
