= Harzé Castle =

Château in Liège Province, Belgium

- Château de Harzé (French)
- Aywaille, Liège Province, Wallonia, Belgium
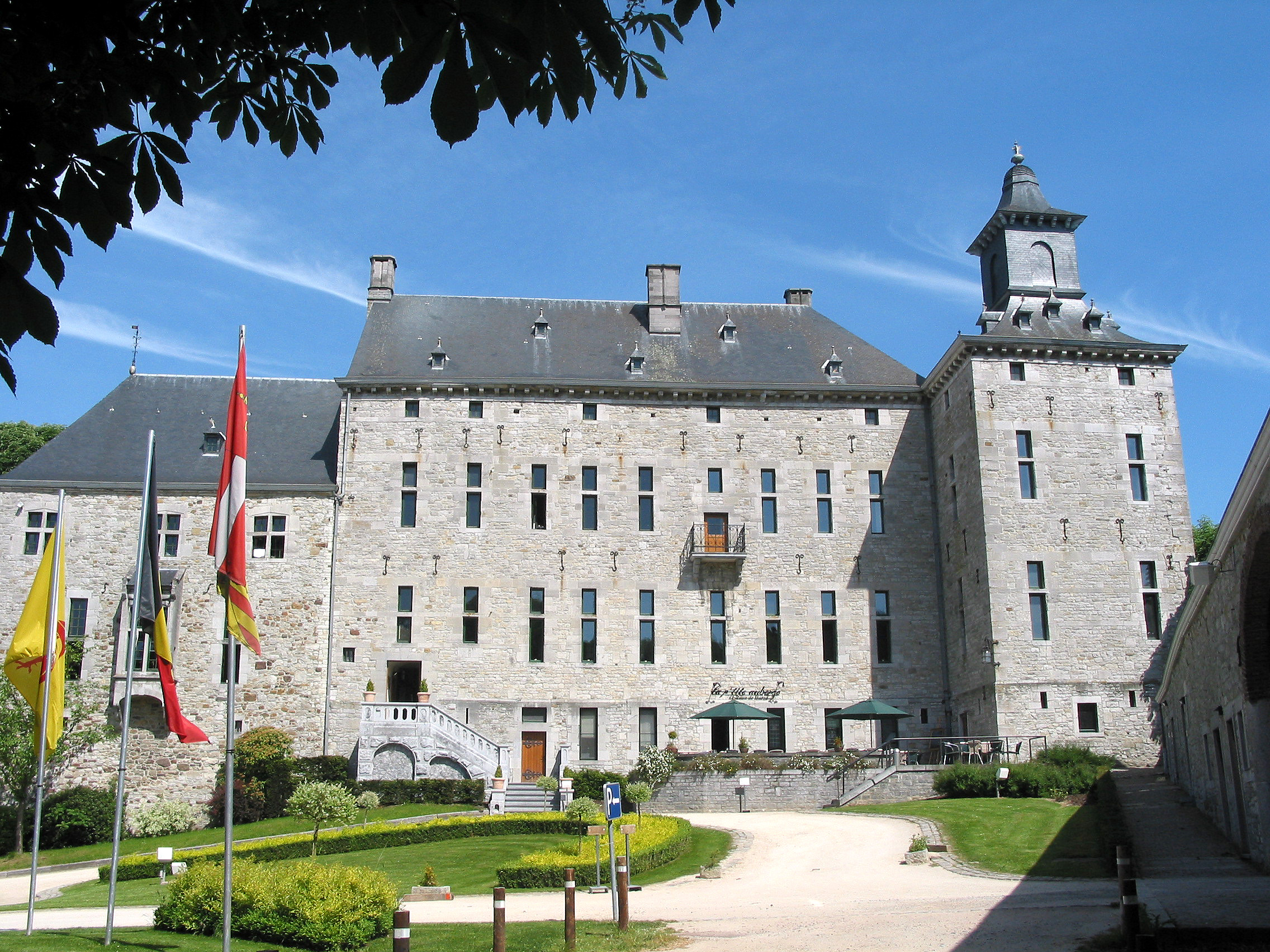

Site information
- Type: Castle
- Open to the public: yes

Location
- Coordinates: 50.441°N 5.666°E

Harzé Castle (French: Château de Harzé) is a castle in the village of Harzé in the municipality of Aywaille, Liège Province, Wallonia, Belgium.

== History ==
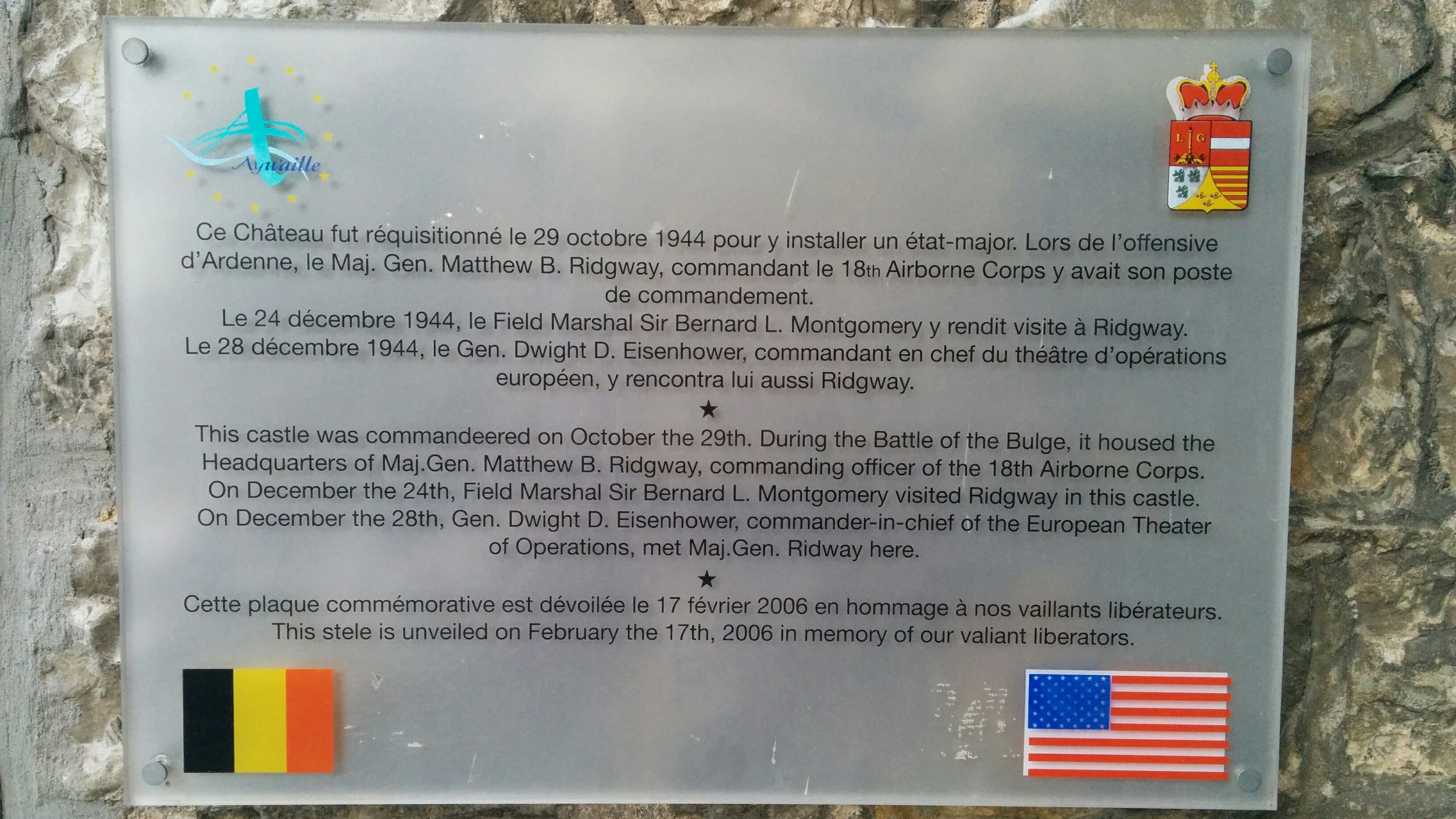
Commemorative plaque unveiled in 2006 to record the use of the building during World War II.

Starting in October 1944, during the closing months of World War II in the European theatre, the castle was the headquarters of the United States Army's XVIII Airborne Corps, under the command of Major General Matthew Ridgway. The castle provided Ridgway's headquarters with a strategic location in the Ardennes, close to the German border. That December, the corps played a significant role in halting the 5th Panzer Army of Nazi Germany in the Battle of the Bulge.

== Present day ==
The castle is now a hotel, restaurant, conference center and wedding venue. The site also houses the Museum of Milling and Baking.

== See also ==
- List of castles in Belgium
