= Kumari (goddess) =

Tradition of worshipping a living goddess in Nepal

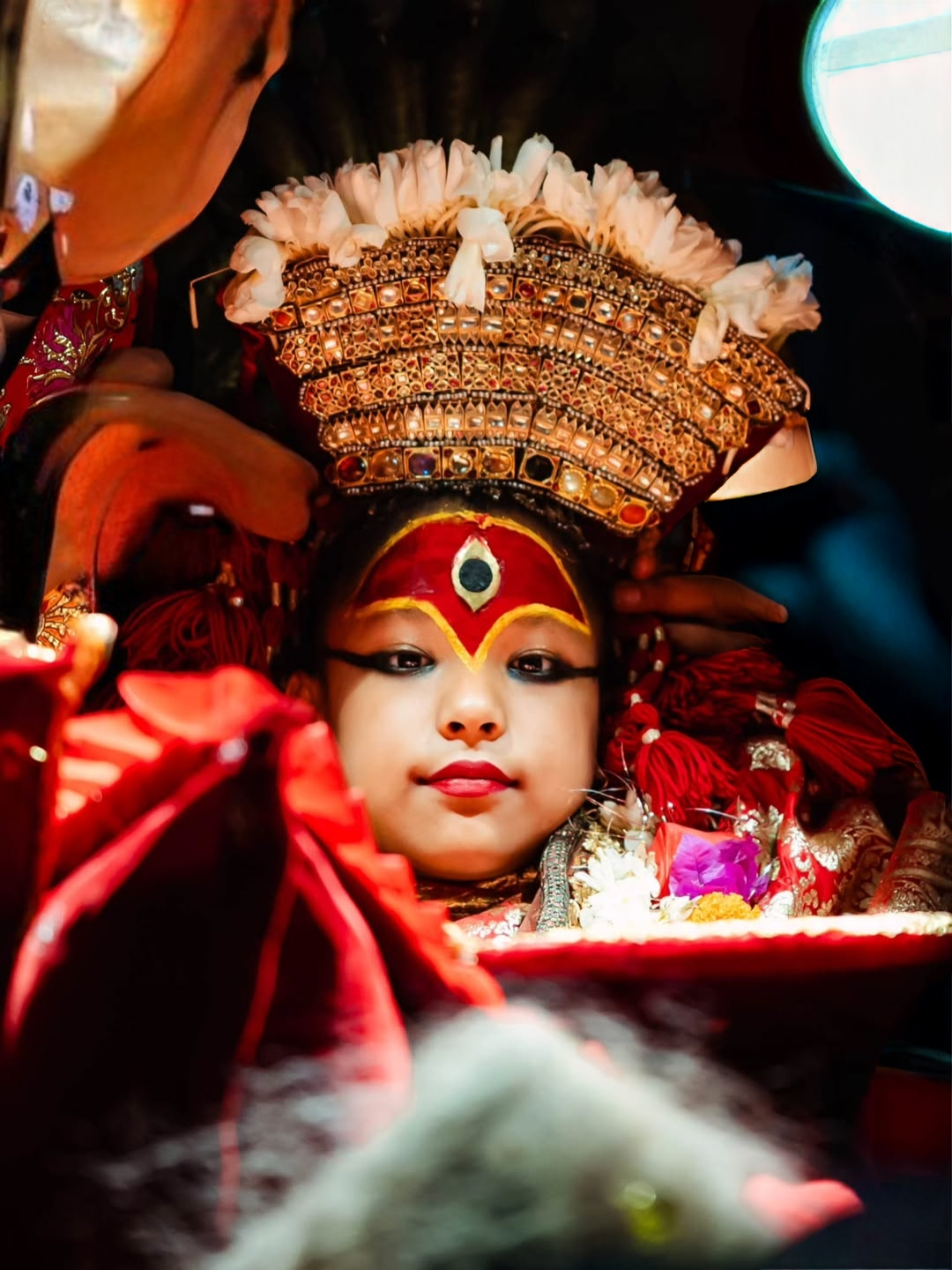
- Trishna Shakya, the Royal Kumari of Kathmandu from 2018 to 2025
- Nepal Bhasa: कुमारी
- Affiliation: Manifestation of Taleju Bhawani, a form of Durga
- Gender: Female
- Region: Kathmandu Valley
- Ethnic group: Newar

The Kumari (Nepali: कुमारी, "young girl" or "unmarried"), also known as the Living Goddess, is a centuries‑old tradition in Nepal in which a prepubescent girl from the Newar community is venerated as a living embodiment of the goddess Taleju Bhawani (a form of Durga). The practice is central to the religious life of the Kathmandu Valley and draws devotees from both Hindu and Buddhist traditions. While several Kumaris exist across the valley, the most prominent is the Royal Kumari of Kathmandu, who resides in the Kumari Ghar at Durbar Square. Other important Kumaris are found in Patan, Bhaktapur, Bungamati, and other local communities.

== Etymology ==
The word Kumari is derived from Sanskrit, where it means "virgin" or "young unmarried girl". In the Newar language the term is also rendered as kumhaḥ (𑐎𑐸𑐩𑑂𑐴𑑅).

== History ==
The worship of young girls as embodiments of divine energy has ancient roots in the Kathmandu Valley. The practice is first recorded in a 1280 inscription from the reign of King Ananta Malla, but oral and ritual traditions point to an origin in the Lichhavi period (c. 400–750 CE). A formalised royal cult, however, is widely linked to the later Malla kings.

The most popular foundation story involves King Jaya Prakash Malla of Kantipur (Kathmandu). According to legend, the goddess Taleju would visit the king nightly to play Tripasa (a dice game), on condition that he tells no one of their meetings. One night the king’s daughter followed him and discovered the goddess, who was angered and vanished. Taleju later appeared in a dream, telling the king to search for a young Shakya girl in whom she would manifest. The tradition of installing a royal Kumari is said to have begun thereafter. Some chronicles also credit King Trailokya Malla (c. 1560–1590) with formalising the institution.

During the Shah dynasty, the annual blessing of the Kumari reinforced royal legitimacy. Every year during Indra Jatra, the king would bow before the Kumari and receive from her a tika. The monarchy was abolished in 2008, but the president of Nepal now fulfills a similar ceremonial role, and the tradition continues under the secular republic.

== Religious significance ==
The Kumari is seen as a living embodiment of Shakti, the primordial cosmic energy that pervades the universe. In the Shakta scripture Devi Mahatmyam, the goddess declares, "I reside in all female beings." The Kumari tradition is a tangible expression of this concept: the goddess is not merely represented in stone or painting but is believed to inhabit the body of a chosen girl. A young girl is chosen over a mature woman because of her inherent purity and the belief that she has not yet been tainted by any form of bodily bleeding or other impurities that could cause the goddess to leave, being just to the theory that the very few religions having feminist deities and ideas aren't far-fetched by the involvement of patriarchal ideas of impurity too.

Hindu tantric texts, such as the Jñanarnava Rudrayamala, assign a specific divine name to a Kumari based on her age, ranging from 1 (Sandhya) to 16 (Ambika). While these names are used in rituals that last only a few hours, they underscore the deep theological link between childhood and the goddess.

Philosophically, the worship of the Kumaris is also a recognition of the divine potential in all human beings, particularly in women. The public darshan (viewing) of the Kumari is considered a powerful blessing, and her silence and composure are interpreted as omens for the future.

== Selection process ==
The search for a new Kumari begins after the sitting goddess leaves her role – when she sheds blood (usually through menarche or an accidental wound) or, in the case of Bungamati, when she loses her first milk tooth. Traditionally, the selection is overseen by senior Vajracharya priests, the royal (or state) priest, the chief astrologer, and, formerly, the king. Today, representatives of the president’s office and the government are also informed.

Candidates are drawn from the Shakya and Bajracharya castes of the Newar community. A girl must be in excellent health, have a perfect body without any scars or birthmarks, never have shed blood, and possess all her teeth. The traditional examination checks the battis lakshanas – the thirty‑two physical perfections described in Hindu iconography. These include a neck like a conch shell, thighs like a deer, a chest like a lion, a voice as soft as a duck's, and exceptionally black hair and eyes. During the royal period, an additional requirement for selection was that her loyality to the king and the royal family would be always shown and expressed and that she would be fearless like him.

Contrary to some popular accounts, former Royal Kumari Rashmila Shakya has stated that the selection process does not involve the frightening "scary room" test with severed heads and masked men. In her autobiography, Shakya explains that the test is an annual ritual that the Kumari participates in after her installation, not a trial for candidates. She also describes the physical examination as neither intimate nor invasive. Once a candidate has been approved, the priests perform secret tantric purification rites until Taleju is believed to enter the girl. She is then dressed in red and gold, and, walking on a white cloth, crosses the palace square to the Kumari Ghar, which will be her home.

== Life of the Royal Kumari ==
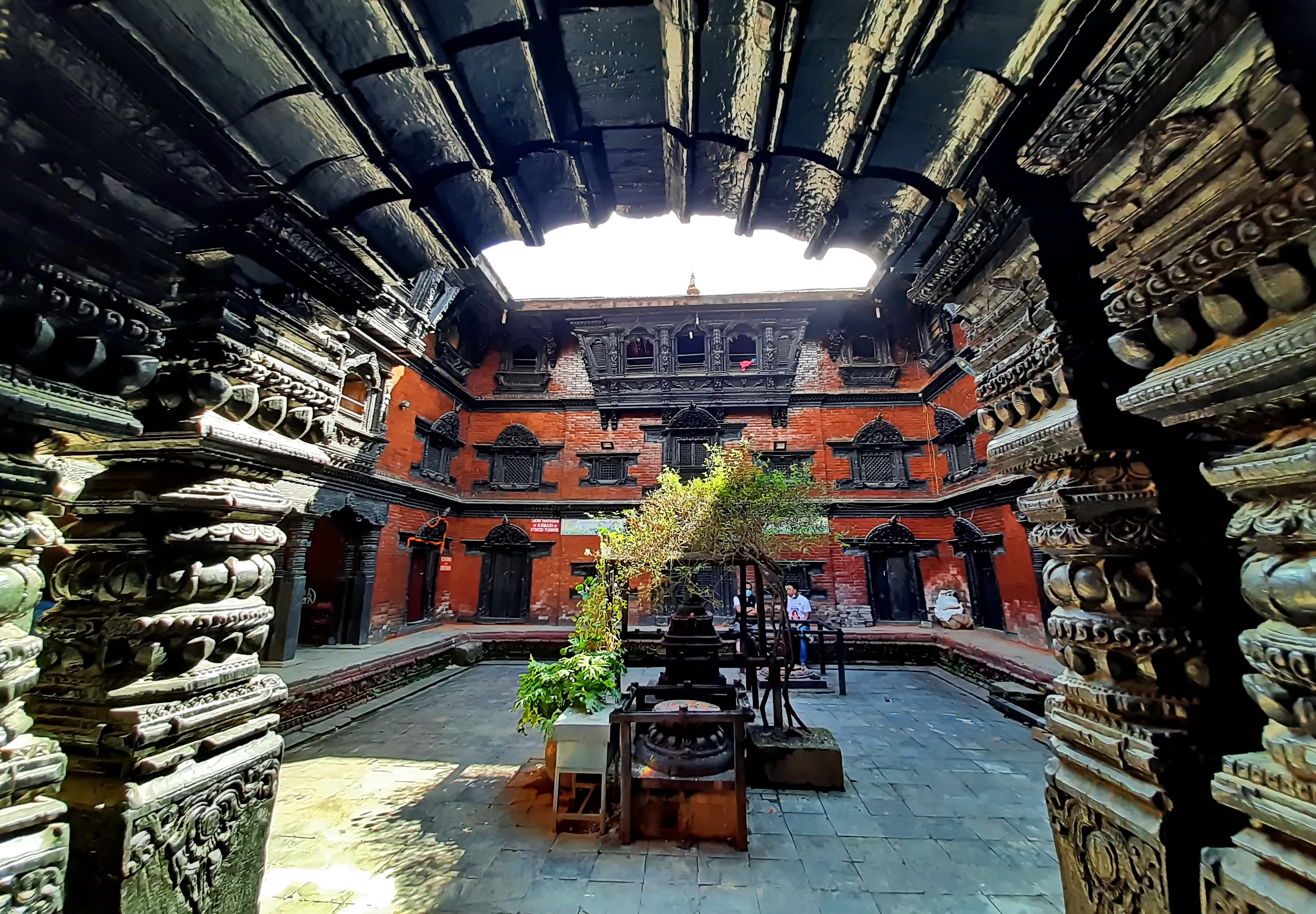
The Kumari Ghar, the residence of the Royal Kumari in Kathmandu

The life of the Royal Kumari is strictly regulated. Her feet are never to touch the ground outside her residence; when she ventures out, she is carried in a golden palanquin or by attendants. She wears red and gold garments, her hair is tied in a topknot, and the agni chakshu ("fire eye") is painted on her forehead. Her family visits infrequently, and her only playmates are the children of her caretakers, who must defer to her every wish.

The Kumari’s public appearances are rare and brief. Devotees gather in the courtyard of the Kumari Ghar, hoping for a glimpse of her through a latticed window. Those granted an audience with her sit on the floor before her gilded throne, kiss her feet, and present offerings. Every movement she makes is scrutinised for omens. Crying or loud laughter is said to presage serious illness or death; hand clapping, a reason to fear the authorities; and picking at food, financial loss. If she remains silent and impassive, the petitioner’s wish is believed to have been granted.

Until recently, the Kumari received no formal education, as she was considered omniscient. Today, however, modern Kumaris attend school or receive private tutoring within the palace. The Kathmandu Kumari, for example, receives daily lessons in Nepali, English, and mathematics.

Her tenure ends when she experiences a major loss of blood—most commonly with her first menstrual period—at which point the goddess is believed to leave her body and the search for a successor begins. The former Kumari then returns to normal life, often facing significant challenges in adjusting to the outside world, and she receives a modest government pension.

== List of Kumaris ==
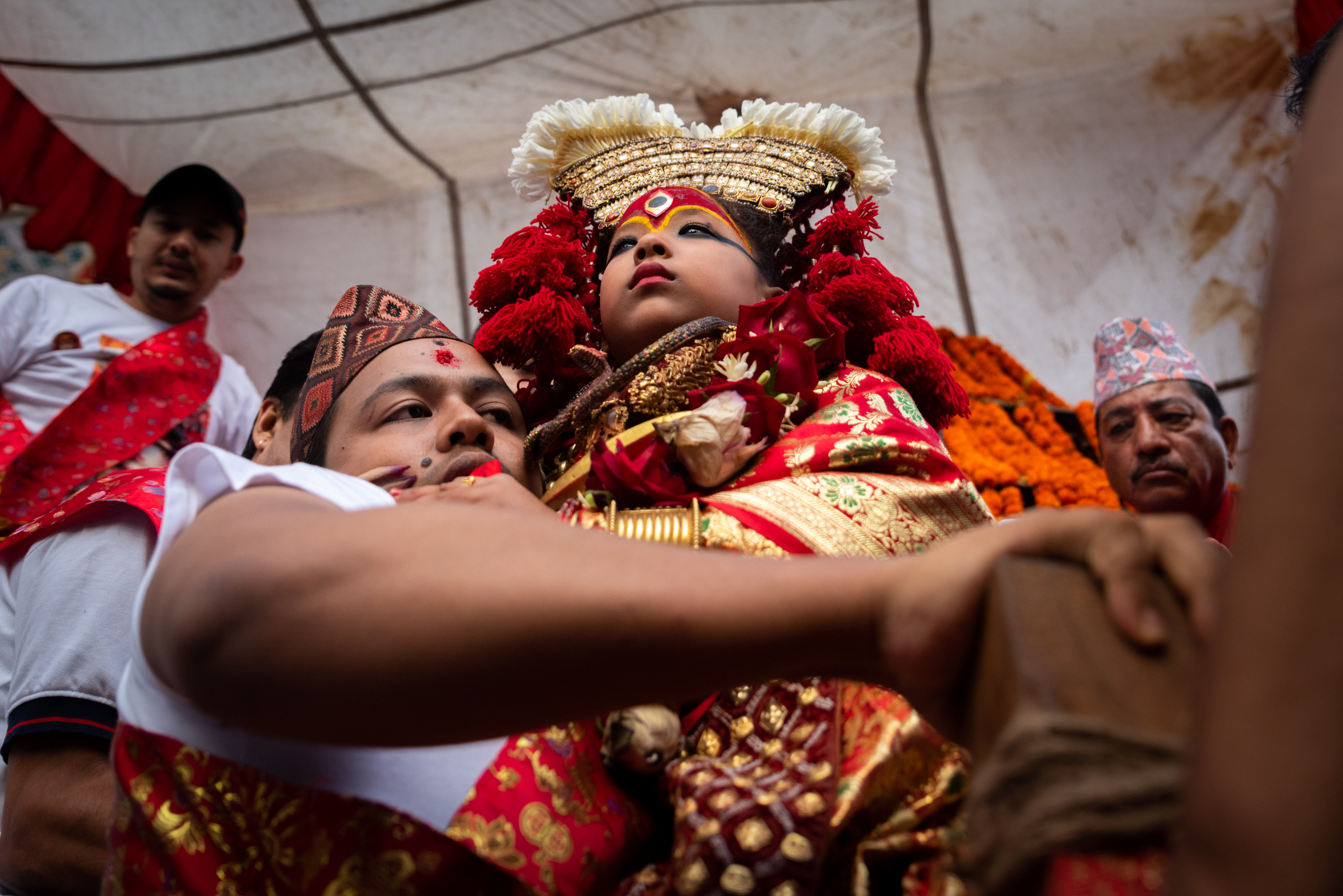
The Royal Kumari of Kathmandu in procession during Indra Jatra

Royal Kumaris of Kathmandu
| Name | Hometown | Period served |
|---|---|---|
| Hira Maiya Shakya | Wotu | 1922–1923 |
| Chini Shova Shakya | Lagan | 1923–1931 |
| Chandra Devi Shakya | Asonchuka | 1931–1933 |
| Dil Kumari Shakya | Lagan | 1933–1942 |
| Nani Shova Shakya | Ombaha: | 1942–1949 |
| Kayo Mayju Shakya | Kwahiti | 1949–1955 |
| Harsha Lakshmi Shakya | Nagha: | 1955–1961 |
| Nani Mayju Shakya | Nagha: | 1961–1969 |
| Sunina Shakya | Ombaha: | 1969–1978 |
| Anita Shakya | Sikamoobaha: | 1978–1984 |
| Rashmila Shakya | Kwahiti | 1984–1991 |
| Amita Shakya | Asanbahal | 1991–2001 |
| Preeti Shakya | Itumbaha: | 2001–2008 |
| Matina Shakya | Itumbaha: | 2008–2017 |
| Trishna Shakya | Ombaha: | 2017–2025 |
| Aryatara Shakya | Itumbaha: | 2025–present |

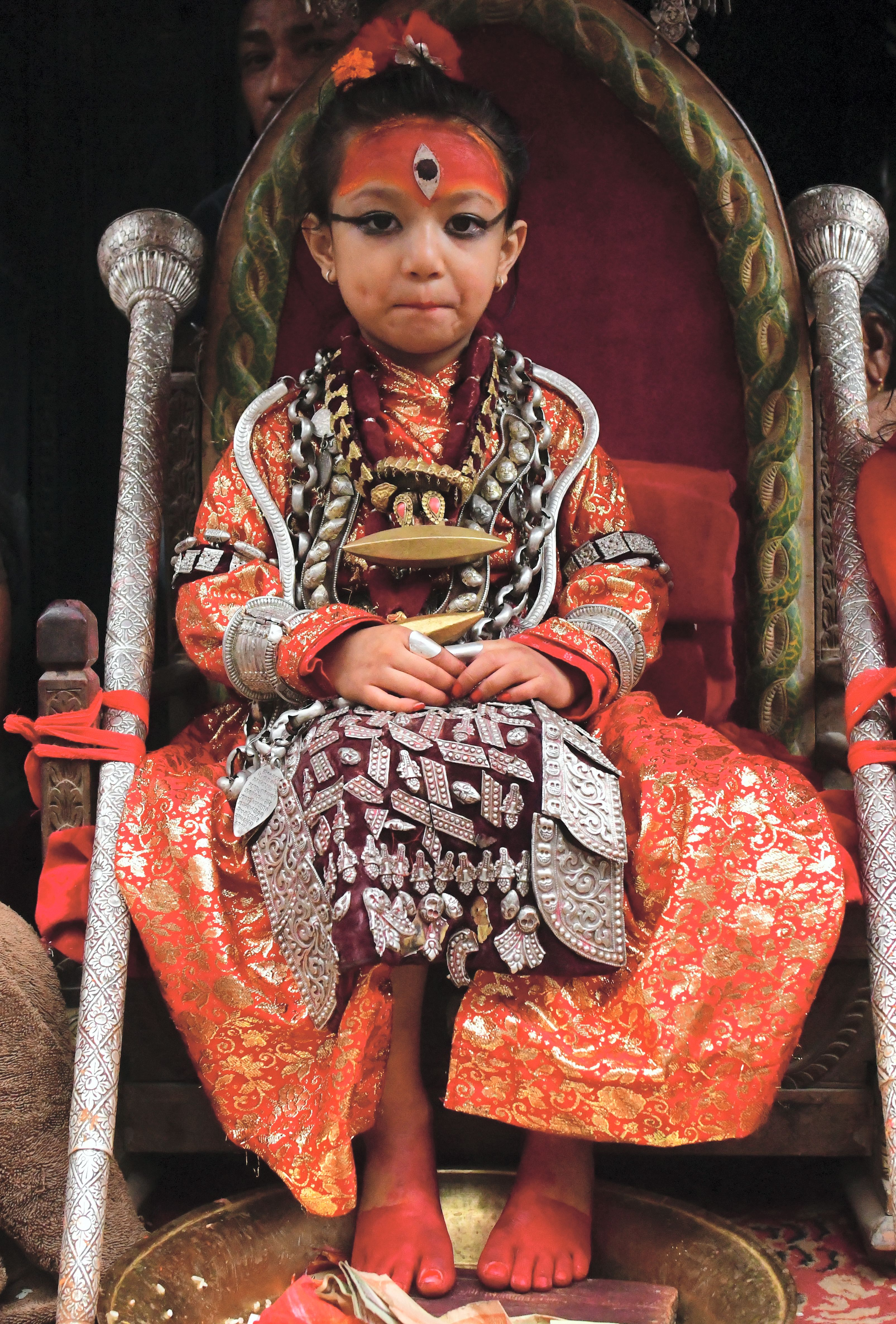
Nihira Bajracharya, the Kumari of Patan (2018)

Kumaris of Patan
| Name | Hometown | Period served |
|---|---|---|
| Dhana Kumari Bajracharya | Patan | 1953–1985 |
| Sanira Bajracharya | Patan | 1985–1992 |
| Chandra Shila (Sumika) Bajracharya | Patan | 1992–2001 |
| Chanira Bajracharya | Patan | 2001–2010 |
| Samita Bajracharya | Patan | 2010–2014 |
| Unika Bajracharya | Patan | 2014–2018 |
| Nihira Bajracharya | Patan | 2018–present |

Kumaris of Bungamati
| Name | Hometown | Period served |
|---|---|---|
| Ganga Bajracharya | Bungamati | 1996–1997 |
| Jamuna Bajracharya | Bungamati | 1997–1998 |
| Rashmi Bajracharya | Bungamati | 1998–2001 |
| Sophiya Bajracharya | Bungamati | 2007–2011 |
| Diya Bajracharya | Bungamati | 2011–2014 |
| Smrity Bajracharya | Bungamati | 2014–2015 |
| Kinjal Bajracharya | Bungamati | 2015–2018 |
| Kripa Bajracharya | Bungamati | 2018–2022 |
| Yubika Bajracharya | Bungamati | 2022–present |

Kumaris of Bhaktapur
| Name | Hometown | Period served |
|---|---|---|
| Nirmalla Shakya | Bhaktapur | –1999 |
| Sajani Shakya | Bhaktapur | 1999–2008 |
| Shreeya Bajracharya | Bhaktapur | 2008–2014 |
| Junisha Shakya | Bhaktapur | 2014–2016 |
| Jibika Bajracharya | Bhaktapur | 2016–2021 |
| Luniva Bajracharya | Bhaktapur | 2021–present |

Note: Additional Kumaris are found in Nuwakot, Tokha, Bagmati, Kilagal, Sankhu, and Panauti, though their histories are less comprehensively documented.

== Controversies ==
=== Dhana Kumari Bajracharya ===
Dhana Kumari Bajracharya served as the Kumari of Patan for over thirty years, until she was forced to step down in 1984 on the instruction of Crown Prince Dipendra. Priests summoned her for inspection but could find no sign of menstruation or impurity; the sole pretext for her removal was a small scratch on her ear. In a notable coincidence, her niece Chanira Bajracharya, then the Patan Kumari, cried uncontrollably for three days shortly before the Nepalese royal massacre of 2001, an event that some interpreted as a divine portent.

=== Sajani Shakya ===
In July 2007, Sajani Shakya, the Kumari of Bhaktapur, traveled to the United States to attend a documentary screening, prompting temple authorities to declare her "tainted" and removed from her position. Following international media attention and the offer of a purification ceremony, the decision was reversed, and she was reinstated.

=== Human rights concerns ===
The practice of isolating a young girl and restricting her education and play has drawn criticism from child‑rights activists. In a 2006 ruling, Nepal’s Supreme Court directed the government to address whether the Kumari tradition violated the rights of the child, while respecting its religious significance. Since then, reforms have been introduced, including the provision of formal education and a state pension for former Kumaris.

== Popular culture ==
- The Kumari appeared in the CBS drama Madam Secretary (season 2, episode 4, "Waiting for Taleju", 2015), where the American secretary of state seeks her blessing after the 2015 earthquake.
- The Korean webtoon For the Sake of Sita features a female lead who was a Kumari.
- In Diana Wynne Jones’s novel The Lives of Christopher Chant, the Living Asheth is inspired by the Kumari tradition.
- The 2008 documentary Living Goddess follows the lives of three young Kumaris and the political upheaval of the time.
- In the video game Far Cry 4, the mythical figure Tarun Matara is loosely based on the Kumari.

== See also ==
- Devi Kanya Kumari – the goddess at Kanyakumari
- Indrani – a Hindu goddess
- Kanya Puja – worship of young girls
- Matrikas – a group of mother goddesses
