= Seo In-guk discography =

Artist discography

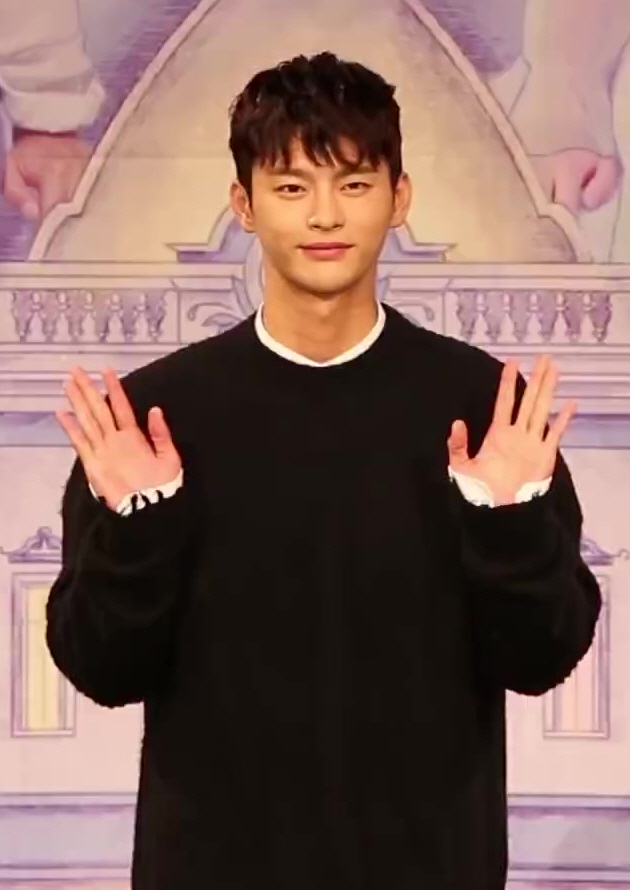
- In September 2016
- Studio albums: 1
- EPs: 7
- Soundtrack albums: 8
- Singles: 16
- Single albums: 1
- Collaborations: 7

South Korean singer and actor Seo In-guk has released one studio album, seven extended plays (EPs), one single album, and fourteen singles.

== Albums ==
=== Studio albums ===
Title	Details	Peak chart positions	Sales
Title	Details	JPN	Sales
Everlasting	Released: January 15, 2014 (JPN); Label: Nippon Crown; Format: CD, CD+DVD, digital download; Track listing: 1. Everlasting Love; 2. Only One; 3. My Voice; 4. Toxic Girl; 5. We Can Dance Tonight; 6. Lovely Girl; 7. 恋しくて; 8. Deep Inside My Heart; 9. Fly Away; 10. Just One Ring; 11. Space de Tour; 12. Hands Up!	17	JPN: 3,456

=== Compilation albums ===
Title	Album details	Peak chart positions	Sales
Title	Album details	JPN	Sales
Last Song	Released: February 25, 2015 (JPN); Label: Nippon Crown; Format: CD, CD+DVD, digital download; Track listing: 1. Fly Away; 2. We Can Dance Tonight; 3. Everlasting Love; 4. もう、会えなくて。; 5. 瞳の中のフォトグラフ; 6. 恋しくて; 7. Toxic Girl; 8. Best Friend; 9. Hands Up!; 10. 遠ざかる (韓国語Ver.); 11. Mellow Spring; 12. 呼ぶよ	38	JPN: 3,190

=== Single albums ===
Title	Album details	Peak chart positions	Sales
Title	Album details	KOR	Sales
Love&Love	Released: June 14, 2022 (KOR); Label: AER Music; Format: CD, digital download, streaming; Track listing: 1. "My Love" (feat. Ravi); 2. "Be My Melody" (질리지 않는 노래); 3. "My Love" (Instrumental)	47	KOR: 10,000
Seo In Guk	Released: June 19, 2024; Label: Episode Music; Format: CD, digital download, streaming	14	KOR: 19,724

== Extended plays ==
Title	Details	Peak chart positions		Sales
Title	Details	KOR	JPN	Sales
Calling (부른다)	Released: October 27, 2009 (KOR); Label: CJ E&M, Genie Music, Stone Music Entertainment; Format: CD, digital download, streaming; Track listing: 1. Young Love; 2. Calling (부른다); 3. Beautiful Separation (아름다운 이별)	—N/a (Note: The Gaon Music Chart began releasing data in 2010.)	—	
Just Beginning	Released: May 6, 2010 (KOR); Label: Jellyfish Entertainment, Kakao M; Format: CD, digital download, streaming; Track listing: 1. Beginning; 2. I Love U (사랑해 U); 3. Last Birthday (마지막 생일); 4. Why Only Smile (왜 웃기만해); 5. Prime Time (feat. Lisa); 6. At First Sight (첫눈에) (feat. Bekah of After School)	8	—	
My Baby U (애기야)	Reissue of Just Beginning; Released: August 10, 2010 (KOR); Label: Jellyfish Entertainment, Kakao M; Format: CD, digital download, streaming; Track listing: 1. Beginning; 2. I Love U (사랑해 U); 3. My Baby U (애기야); 4. Last Birthday (마지막 생일); 5. Why Only Smile (왜 웃기만해); 6. Prime Time (feat. Lisa); 7. At First Sight (첫눈에) (feat. Bekah of After School); 8. I Love U (사랑해 U) (Lovely Ver.)	14	—	
Perfect Fit	Released: April 12, 2012 (KOR); Label: Jellyfish Entertainment, Kakao M; Format: CD, digital download, streaming; Track listing: 1. Bad; 2. Tease Me (밀고 당겨줘); 3. Time Machine (feat. Swings); 4. Brand New Day; 5. Tease Me (밀고 당겨줘) (Inst.)	15	—	KOR: 3,145
Hug	Released: June 25, 2014 (JPN); Label: Nippon Crown; Format: CD, CD+DVD, digital download; Track listing: 1. もう、会えなくて。; 2. 君の色; 3. Good-Bye Dear; 4. 瞳の中のフォトグラフ; 5. 遠ざかる (Korean Ver.); 6. 美しい絶望; 7. 遠ざかる (Japanese Ver.) (Bonus Track)	—	28	
SIGnature	Released: September 6, 2024 (JPN); Label: Muport; Format: CD, CD+DVD, digital download; Track listing: 1. 空のかおり (하늘의 향기); 2. 運命の糸 (운명의 실); 3. Right Now; 4. Galaxy; 5. 君という花 (너라는 꽃); 6. 空のかおり (하늘의 향기) - Instrumental	—	—	
Iro	Released: September 3, 2025; Label: Muport; Format: CD, digital download, streaming	—	6	JPN: 23,649
Trace	Released: September 30, 2026 (JPN); Label: Muport; Format: CD, digital download, streaming; Track listing: 1. 午前０時 (gozenreiji-0AM); 2. Tipsy; 3. 2人だけ (hutaridake-Real love); 4. だから待ってる (dakara matteru-Waiting for you); 5. 面影 (omokage-Afterglow); 6. Tipsy - Instrumental	—	—	
"—" denotes releases that did not chart or were not released in that region.

== Singles ==
=== As lead artist ===
Title	Year	Peak chart positions		Sales	Album
Title	Year	KOR	JPN	Sales	Album
Korean
"Calling" (부른다)	2009	—N/a	—		Calling
"Run to Me" (달려와)	2009	—N/a	—		Non-album single
"I Love U" (사랑해 U)	2010	2	—	KOR: 1,721,996	Just Beginning
"My Baby U" (애기야)	2010	9	—	KOR: 1,074,363	Just Beginning and My Baby U
"Take" (Note: "Take" is a Korean cover of "Take On Me" by A-ha.)	2010	42	—		Non-album singles
"Broken"	2011	12	—	KOR: 461,461	Non-album singles
"Shake It Up"	2011	16	—	KOR: 655,570	Non-album singles
"Tease Me" (밀고 당겨줘)	2012	18	—	KOR: 598,990	Perfect Fit
"I Can't Live Because of You" (너 땜에 못살아) (featuring Verbal Jint)	2013	4	—	KOR: 771,403	Y.BIRD from Jellyfish Island With Seo In Guk
"With Laughter or with Tears" (웃다 울다)	2013	6	—	KOR: 625,703	With Laughter or with Tears
"Loved You" (이별남녀) (with Zia)	2013	1	—	KOR: 514,102	Loved You
"Mellow Spring (Bomtanaba)" (봄 타나봐)	2014	6	—	KOR: 443,678	Non-album singles
"Seasons of the Heart" (너 라는 계절)	2016	12	—	KOR: 168,908	Non-album singles
"BeBe"	2016	39	—	KOR: 39,216	Non-album singles
"Better Together" (함께 걸어)	2017	64	—	KOR: 26,881	Non-album singles
"My Love" (featuring Ravi)	2022	70	—		Love&Love
"Fallen"	2022	126	—		Non-album singles
"Couple" (커플) (with Jung Eun-ji)	2025	88	—		Non-album singles
Japanese
"Fly Away"	2013	—	32	JPN: 2,968	Everlasting and Last Song
"We Can Dance Tonight"	2013	—	21		Everlasting and Last Song
"—" denotes releases that did not chart or were not released in that region.

=== As collaborating artist ===
Title	Year	Peak position	Other artist(s)	Album
Title	Year	KOR	Other artist(s)	Album
"Refresh" (새로고침)	2010	51	Yoon Jong Shin, Lyn	行步 2010 YOON JONG SHIN
"Christmas Time"	2010	25	Sung Si-kyung, Park Hyo-shin, Brian Joo, Lisa, Park Hak-ki, Kim Hyeong-jung, Kyun Woo	Jelly Christmas
"Love Again"	2011	29	Take-1	Take No. 1 – Vol. 3
"Christmas for All" (모두에게 크리스마스)	2011	27	Sung Si-kyung, Brian Joo, Park Hak-ki, Park Jang-hyun, Hwang Project	Jelly Christmas 2011
"Because It's Christmas" (크리스마스니까)	2012	1	Sung Si-kyung, Park Hyo-shin, Lee Seok-hoon, VIXX	Jelly Christmas 2012 HEART PROJECT
"Winter Confession" (겨울 고백)	2013	1	Sung Si-kyung, Park Hyo-shin, VIXX, Little Sister	Jelly Christmas 2013
"Sad Lie" (슬픈거짓말)	2014	21	DK of December	CS NUMBERS
"Love in the Air" (사랑난로)	2015	14	VIXX, Park Jung-ah, Park Yoon-ha	Jelly Christmas 2015 – 4랑
"OMG"	2016	—	Double K, Dok2	Non-album single
"Falling" (니가 내려와)	2016	34	VIXX, Gugudan, Park Yoon-ha, Park Jung-ah, Kim Gyu-sun, Kim Ye-won, Jiyul	Jelly Box Jelly Christmas 2016
"Merry Merry Christmas Day" (메리메리크리스마스데이)	2021	—	Story J Company X AER Music	2021 Christmas Day

== Soundtrack appearances ==
Title	Year	Peak chart position	Sales	Album
Title	Year	KOR	Sales	Album
"Fate (Like a Fool)" (운명 (바보처럼))	2012	—	KOR: 34,034	Love Rain OST
"All For You" (with Jung Eun-ji) (Note: The Reply 1997 OST "All For You" with Jung Eun-ji was also released as Love Story – Part 1.)	2012	1	KOR: 2,499,273	Reply 1997 OST
"Just the Way We Love" (우리 사랑 이대로) (with Jung Eun-ji) (Note: "The Reply 1997 OST "Just the Way We Love" with Jung Eun-ji was also released as Love Story – Part 2.)	2012	3	KOR: 1,428,802	Reply 1997 OST
"No Matter What" (겁도 없이)	2013	2	KOR: 553,041	Master's Sun OST
"Finding Myself" (돌아오는길)	2014	13	KOR: 103,627	High School King of Savvy OST
"Flower" (꽃)	2017	68	KOR: 18,863	Tomorrow With You OST
"Star" (별, 우리)	2018	—		The Smile Has Left Your Eyes OST
"Distant Fate" (아득한 먼 훗날 우리가)	2021	—		Doom at Your Service OST
"Even If There's No Miracle" (기적은 없어도)	2023	—		Death's Game OST
"The One Who Fills Me" (날 채워준 한 사람)	2026	—		See You at Work Tomorrow! OST
"—" denotes releases that did not chart or were not released in that region.

== Other charted songs ==
Title	Year	Peak chart positions	Album
Title	Year	KOR	Album
"Last Birthday"	2010	81	Just Beginning
"At First Sight" (feat. Bekah of After School)	2010	89	Just Beginning
"Prime Time" (feat. Lisa)	2010	94	Just Beginning
"Why Only Smile"	2010	99	Just Beginning
"Were We Happy" (feat. Ku Hye-sun)	2013	74	With Laughter or with Tears

== Writing credits ==
All music credits are adapted from the Korea Music Copyright Association's database, unless otherwise noted.

Year	Song	Album	Lyrics		Music	
Year	Song	Album	Credited	With	Credited	With
2009	"Young Love"	Calling	Yes	–	No	Pdogg
2010	"Refresh"	Director's Cut	Yes	Yoon Jong-shin, Ha Lim, Joung Ji Chan, Lyn, Kim Tae-woo	No	Yoon Jong-shin
2011	"Shake It Up"	Non-album single	Yes	–	No	Joleen Belle, Joachim Svare, Jimmy Andrew Richard
2012	"Fate (Like a Fool)"	Love Rain OST	Yes	–	Yes	–
2014	"Kimi no Iro"	hug	No	Kushita Manon	Yes	Park Kyung-hyun
2014	"Far Away"	hug	Yes	Melodesign	Yes	Melodesign
2015	"Last Song"	Last Song	Yes	-	Yes	Park Kyung-hyun
2015	"Light of My Life"	Last Song	Yes	Park Kyung-hyun	Yes	Minken, Park Kyung-hyun
2016	"Seasons of the Heart"	Non-album single	Yes	Kim Ji-yang	Yes	Seo Jung-jin, Kim Doo-hyun
2016	"OMG"	Non-album single	Yes	nior, Sohn Chang-il, Dokki	Yes	nior, Sohn Chang-il
2016	"BeBe"	Non-album single	Yes	–	Yes	Melodesign, Fascinating, Keeproots, Oberg Andreas Gustav Erik, Alwani Hani
2017	"Better Together"	Non-album single	Yes	–	Yes	Madeby, Park Kyung-hyun
2017	"Mint Chocolate" _{(feat. 40)}	Non-album single	Yes	40	Yes	40, nior
2017	"Flower"	Tomorrow With You OST	Yes	–	Yes	Cho Yong-ho
2018	"Star"	The Smile Has Left Your Eyes OST	Yes	Jung So-min	No	UK, Jung Soo-min
2021	"Distant Fate"	Doom at Your Service OST	Yes	Kim Ina	Yes	Park Kyung-hyun
2021	"Merry Merry Christmas Day"	2021 Christmas Story	Yes	Garam	Yes	Park Kyung-hyun, Mo Sang-hoon
2022	"MY LOVE (Feat. Ravi)"	Non-album single	Yes	Ravi, Mo Sang-hoon, Park Kyung-hyun	Yes	Ravi, Mo Sang-hoon, Park Kyung-hyun
2022	"BE MY MELODY"	Non-album single	Yes	Kim Ji-hyang	Yes	Mo Sang-hoon, Seo Jeong-jin, Park Kyung-hyun

== Videography ==
=== Music videos ===
Title	Year	Notes
Korean
"Calling"	2009	
"I Love U"	2010	
"Broken"	2011	
"Shake It Up"	2011	Guest appearances by Mighty Mouth, Jewelry, Jiyeon (T-ara) and Norazo; Cameo appearances by N, Leo, and Ravi (VIXX)
"Tease Me"	2012	Guest appearances by Son Eun-seo and Lee Hong-bin (VIXX)
"I Can't Live Because of You" (featuring Verbal Jint)	2013	
"With Laughter or with Tears"	2013	Guest appearance by Koo Hye-sun
"Mellow Spring (Bomtanaba)"	2014	
"Seasons of the Heart"	2016	
"BeBe"	2016	
"Better Together"	2017	
"My Love" (featuring Ravi)	2022	Guest appearance by Shin Do-hyun
Japanese
"Fly Away"	2013	
"We Can Dance Tonight"	2013	
"Everlasting Love"	2014	
"もう、会えなくて。"	2014	
"Last Song"	2015	
As collaborating artist
"Christmas Time"	2010	with Sung Si-kyung, Park Hyo-shin, Brian Joo, Lisa, Park Hak-ki, Kim Hyeong-jung, Kyun Woo
"All for You"	2012	with Jung Eun-ji
"Because It's Christmas"	2012	with Sung Si-kyung, Park Hyo-shin, Lee Seok-hoon, VIXX
"Would You?"	2013	with Swings
"OMG"	2016	with Double K, Dok2
"Merry Merry Christmas Day"	2021	Story J Company X AER Music
