= Jelly Box =

South Korean music channel

- Type of project: Music
- Location: Seoul
- Owner: Jellyfish Entertainment
- Founder: Hwang Se-jun
- Country: South Korea
- Established: June 8, 2016
- Website: Jelly Box

Jelly Box (Korean: 젤리박스) is a music channel project in South Korea, operated by Jellyfish Entertainment. It was created on June 8, 2016 and undertook to release singles periodically.

== Background and release ==
On June 3, 2016, Jellyfish Entertainment announced the launch of their new music channel Jelly Box, through which Jellyfish Entertainment artists will explore various music genres and broaden their musical influence to the public. Jelly Box is similar to Jellyfish Entertainment's previous project Y.Bird from Jellyfish Island and will showcase Jellyfish Entertainment artists and producers and include collaborations with artists outside of the label.

== Notable singles ==
The first single to be released under Jelly Box was "Summer Night's Picnic" (Korean: 여름밤피크닉) by Park Yoon-ha and Yoo Seung-woo and was released on June 8, 2016.

On July 14, 2016, the second single released under Jelly Box was "DamnRa" by Ravi of VIXX featuring SAM&SP3CK; a DJ/producer duo. "DamnRa" was released along with a performance music video.

The third single released under Jelly Box was "Flower Way" (Korean: 꽃길; RR: Kkotgil) by Sejeong of Gugudan and produced by Block B's Zico during an episode of the variety show Talents for Sale. "Flower Way" was released along with a music video. The song topped numerous Korean real-time digital charts when it was released on November 23, 2016. "Flower Way" also earned Sejeong her first music program win as a solo artist on the November 30th episode of Show Champion.

== Singles ==
Title	Artist(s)	Release	Peak chart positions	Sales (DL)
Title	Artist(s)	Release	KOR Gaon	Sales (DL)
"Summer Night's Picnic" (여름밤피크닉)	Park Yoon-ha X Yoo Seung-woo	June 8, 2016	—	—
"DamnRa"	Ravi (Feat. SAM&SP3CK)	July 14, 2016	— (Note: "DamnRa" did not enter the Gaon Digital Chart, but peaked at number 43 on the Gaon Social Chart.)	—
"Flower Way" (꽃길)	Sejeong (Prod. By Zico)	November 23, 2016	2	KOR: 536,238+
"Falling" (니가 내려와)	Seo In-guk, VIXX, Gugudan, Park Yoon-ha, Park Jung-ah, Kim Gyu-sun, Kim Ye-won, Jiyul	December 13, 2016	34	KOR: 52,439+
"—" denotes releases that did not chart or were not released in that region.
