= One Candle =

Single by g.o.d

from the album Chapter 3
- Language: Korean
- Released: November 3, 2000
- Genre: K-pop
- Length: 3:31
- Label: Sidus, Synnara Records
- Composer: Park Jin-young
- Lyricist: Park Jin-young

G.o.d singles chronology
"Lies" (2000)	"One Candle" (2000)	"Road" (2001)

"One Candle" (Korean: 촛불하나; RR: Chotbulhana) is a song performed by South Korean boy band g.o.d. It is from their third album Chapter 3 (2000), and has since become one of their most widely-known songs.

== Music ==
The lyrics and music were composed by Park Jin-young. He stated that the lyrics were inspired by a quote he saw on graffiti while visiting New York City: "Better to light a candle than curse the darkness." The song was promoted alongside the title track "Lies". At that time, the group was not managed by his company JYP Entertainment but he worked closely with them as a producer and songwriter. The accompanying soundtrack was also included in the album and was arranged by composer and music producer Bang Si-hyuk, who went on to establish Big Hit Entertainment.

The song is unusual as it opens with a spoken narration by Danny Ahn introducing the theme of the song, followed by Yoon Kye-sang and Son Ho-young rapping the verse. The chorus is sung in the American gospel style. The introduction is accentuated by handclaps and the audience is often encouraged to clap along during live performances.

== Reception and commercial performance ==
The immense success of the album's title track "Lies" largely overshadowed "One Candle", which did not garner any recognition or awards despite being one of two songs promoted alongside "Lies" when the album was first released. Despite this the song has since become well-known both within South Korea and the Korean diaspora in the United States.

Already a popular and familiar noraebang song, "One Candle" charted in the Gaon Music Charts for the first time when g.o.d reunited in July 2014, following a nine-year hiatus. It reached #80 in the Digital Chart and peaked at #70 in the Noraebang Chart.

== In popular culture ==
"Sky Blue Promise" (하늘색 약속), one of the pre-released songs from g.o.d's 15th anniversary album Chapter 8, heavily references "One Candle". It was a homage to their past hits and utilizes several lines from "One Candle" as well as the rhythm.

As "One Candle" is considered one of g.o.d's best known songs, it is frequently referred to whenever a member appears on television. Danny Ahn, Son Ho-young and Kim Tae-woo performed it together during their appearance on the Mnet music talk show The Playlist. Ahn performed his own rap part in his drama The Three Witches during a scene in which his character marries Shin Dong-mi's character. The song was referenced during Yoon Kye-sang's appearance on Saturday Night Live Korea in which his character from The Outlaws, mobster Jang Chen, starts composing his own poem (by directly quoting the first verse of "One Candle").

The uplifting lyrics and recognizability of "One Candle" have made it popular as a protest song. It was notably sung during the candlelight rallies and protests calling for the removal of President Park Geun-hye and the protests following the 2024 martial law crisis. Cultural commentators have noted that the lyrics were still relevant despite being written during the 2000s.

Is not a candle very fragile? The Saenuri politician said that the candle would be blown out by the wind, but the small, slender candles gathered two, three, and four, and finally it became a torch and went wild. It is communal power. "I will always be by your side / so that you never feel alone in this world. / I'll be right beside you holding your hand." [...] These lyrics reflect the condition of our society.
— Professor Kim Tae-il on KBS Radio 1

The song was featured in a short film The Gil, which documented four British indie artists' dive into K-pop through remaking "One Candle" and "The Road". Directed by Korean-British Jeon Saet-byeol, the film was produced to commemorate 140 years of diplomatic relations between the United Kingdom and Korea.

== Notable cover versions ==
Traveling British busker Aancod Zaccarelli, who previously lived in South Korea as a teenager, sang the song accompanied by his guitar on a platform at the Seoul National University Station. Subsequent videos of the sizeable crowds of commuters singing and clapping along with him were uploaded on social media and went viral. The videos caught the attention of g.o.d leader Park Joon-hyung, who publicly complimented him during a press conference. He was invited to g.o.d's 15th anniversary concert series and performed on July 12, 2014, as the opening act.

The song has been covered numerous times by younger artists and sung at year-end ceremonies and festivals as an encore song. It was performed at the 2015 KBS Drama Awards by nominees for the Best New Actor and Actress awards and all participants at the 2016 KBS Song Festival during the opening stage. Other notable cover versions include:

- Katie Kim (K-pop Star season 4, Top 6 round)
- Park Ji-yeon, JB, Park Seo-joon and Ailee in the television series Dream High 2
- Son Seung-yeon and friends (winner of Immortal Songs: Singing the Legend episode 229)
- Yook Joong-wan and Lee Joo-hyuk (winner of MBC's Duet Song Festival episode 44)
