= Park Yoon-ha =

South Korean singer (born 1999)

- Born: Park Yoon-ha; April 17, 1999 (age 27); South Korea
- Other name: Park Yun-ha
- Occupation: Singer
- Known for: K-pop Star 4 (TOP 6)
- Musical career
- Genre: K-pop
- Instrument: Vocals
- Years active: 2014–present
- Label: Jellyfish Entertainment

Park Yoon-ha (Korean: 박윤하; born April 17, 1999), also spelled Park Yun-ha, is a South Korean singer signed under Jellyfish Entertainment. She is known for reaching the TOP 6 in the fourth season of the South Korean reality television competition show K-pop Star.

== Career ==
=== 2014–present: K-pop Star 4 and collaborations ===
In 2014 Park Yoon-ha successfully auditioned for the fourth season of the South Korean reality television competition show K-pop Star, which aired from November 23, 2014 to April 19, 2015 on SBS. After several rounds and stage performances on the show, Park was eliminated on March 22, 2015.

K-pop Star 4 performances and results

Episode #	Song – Original Artist	Rank	Result	Notes
15	그대 내 품에 (Holding You in My Arms) – Yoo Jae-ha	Elimination Candidate	Top 8	Top 8 Finals (March 1 & 8)
17	One Last Cry – Brian McKnight	—N/a	Top 6	Top 6 Finals (March 15)
18	가시나무 – 시인과 촌장	—N/a	Eliminated	Top 4 Finals (March 22)

In May, Park was featured in Kim Sung-kyu's single "Reply" (답가) from his second solo album 27, the single charted at 29 on the Gaon Music Chart.

In July 2015, Park signed an exclusive contract with Jellyfish Entertainment. On July 20, the agency announced the good news, revealing, "Park Yoon Ha has signed an exclusive contract with us. Despite Park Yoon Ha's young age, she has a clear and delicate voice and potential musical talents. In the future, we will provide her full support to help Park Yoon Ha improve her skills in respect to her colors and music direction and will help her grow into a great artist, combining her playing skills and singing."

On December 15, 2015 Jellyfish Entertainment released their Jelly Christmas 2015 – 4랑 single album featuring the song, "Love in the Air" (사랑난로). The announced participating the Jellyfish artists were Park Yoon-ha, Seo in Guk, VIXX and former Jewelry member Park JungA. The single charted at number 14 on the digital Gaon Chart.

On June 8, 2016, Park participated in Jellyfish Entertainment's new music channel project Jelly Box and released the single "Summer Night's Picnic" (여름밤피크닉) with Yoo Seung-woo.

Park participated in Jellyfish Entertainment's winter project, Jelly Christmas 2016, with her label mates Seo In-guk, VIXX, Gugudan, Park Jung-ah, Kim Gyu-sun, Kim Ye-won and Jiyul. The title track, "Falling" (니가 내려와) was released digitally on December 13, 2016.

== Discography ==
=== Singles ===
Title	Year	Peak chart positions	Sales	Album
Title	Year	KOR	Sales	Album
As lead artist
"Sad Fate" (슬픈 인연)	2014	83		K-pop Star 4 OST
"One Last Cry"	2015	—		K-pop Star 4 OST
"Find Me" (나를 찾아줘)	2018	—		Non-album singles
"Lost Winter" (지는 겨울)	2018	—		Non-album singles
"Can't Help It" (어쩔 수 없어)	2018	—		Non-album singles
Collaborations
"I Have to Forget You" (슬픔 속에 그댈 지워야만 해) with Jung Seung-hwan	2015	1		K-pop Star 4 OST
"Love in the Air" (사랑난로) with Seo In-guk, Park Jung-ah, VIXX	2015	14		Jelly Christmas 2015 – 4랑
"Summer Night's Picnic" (여름밤피크닉) with Yoo Seung-woo	2016	—		Jelly Box
"Falling" (니가 내려와) with Seo In-guk, VIXX, Gugudan, Park Jung-ah, Kim Gyu-sun, Kim Ye-won and Jiyul	2016	34		Jelly Christmas 2016
"—" denotes release did not chart.

== Filmography ==
=== Variety shows ===
Year	Network	Title	Notes
2014	SBS	K-pop Star 4	Contestant
