= Jelly Christmas =

Album series by Jellyfish Entertainment

Compilation album by Jellyfish Entertainment
- Genre: Christmas; R&B; Ballad; Pop; K-pop
- Label: Jellyfish Entertainment, CJ E&M Music and Live
- Producer: Hwang Se-jun (executive)

Singles from Jelly Christmas
- 1. "Christmas Time" Released: December 6, 2010; 2. "Christmas for All" Released: December 2, 2011; 3. "Because It's Christmas" Released: December 5, 2012; 4. "Winter Confession" Released: December 12, 2013; 5. "Love In The Air" Released: December 15, 2015; 6. "Falling" Released: December 13, 2016

Jelly Christmas is a series of annually released special winter single albums by Jellyfish Entertainment which includes six Christmas singles from their artists. The singles were released on different dates, across six years.

== Singles ==
=== Jelly Christmas ===
In December 2010 Jellyfish Entertainment artists came together for the first time for the Jelly Christmas holiday album project with the single "Christmas Time". The participating Jellyfish artists were Sung Si Kyung, Park Hyo-shin, Seo In-guk, Brian Joo, Lisa, Park Hak Ki, Kim Hyeong-jung and Kyun Woo. The single was released on December 6, 2010.

=== Jelly Christmas 2011 ===
In December 2011, Jellyfish Entertainment artists Sung Si-kyung, Brian Joo, Seo In-guk, Park Hak Ki, Park Jang Hyun and Hwang Project came together again for Jelly Christmas with the single "Christmas for All" (Korean: 모두에게 크리스마스). The single was released on December 2, 2011.

=== Jelly Christmas 2012 Heart Project ===
Jellyfish Entertainment artists Sung Si-kyung, Park Hyo-shin, Lee Seok Hoon, Seo In Guk and VIXX came together for the Jelly Christmas 2012 Heart Project with the single “Because It's Christmas” (Korean: 크리스마스니까). It was released on December 5, 2012. The single peaked at number 1 on the digital Gaon Chart. The proceeds from Jelly Christmas 2012 Heart Project was donated to The Salvation Army Korea.

=== 겨울 고백 (Jelly Christmas 2013) ===
In December 2013, VIXX, Sung Si-kyung, Park Hyo-shin, Seo In-guk and Little Sister came together for Jelly Christmas 2013 with ”Winter Confession” (Korean: 겨울고백). It was released on December 12, 2013. The single peaked at number 1 on the digital Gaon Chart. The music video for ”Winter Confession” features a story told in sand animation which give feelings of warmth and romance.

=== Jelly Christmas 2015 – 4랑 ===
On December 15, 2015 Jellyfish Entertainment released their Jelly Christmas 2015 single album featuring the song, “Love In The Air” (Korean: 사랑난로). The artists who participated were Seo In Guk, VIXX, former Jewelry member Park JungA and former K-pop Star 4 contestant Park Yoon-ha. The single placed at 14 on the digital Gaon Chart. The music video features Jellyfish actress Kim Gyu-sun, who plays a young woman getting ready for Christmas Eve by recreating her childhood traditions.

=== Jelly Christmas 2016 ===
On December 13, 2016, Jellyfish Entertainment released their Jelly Christmas 2016 single album featuring the song, "Falling" (Korean: 니가 내려와) as part of both their annual Jelly Christmas albums and their digital music channel project Jelly Box. The artists who participated were Seo In-guk, VIXX, Jellyfish Entertainment's first girl group Gugudan, Park Yoon-ha, Park Jung-ah, Kim Gyu-sun, Kim Ye-won and Jiyul.

== Track listing ==
Jelly Christmas
No.	Title	Artists	Length
1.	"Christmas Time"	Sung Si-kyung, Park Hyo-shin, Seo In-guk, Brian Joo, Lisa, Park Hak-ki, Kim Hyeong-jung, Kyun Woo	4:17
2.	"Christmas Time" (Inst.)		4:17

Jelly Christmas 2011
No.	Title	Artists	Length
1.	"Christmas for All" (모두에게 크리스마스; Moduege Keuliseumaseu)	Sung Si-kyung, Brian Joo, Seo In-guk, Park Hak-ki, Park Jang-hyun, Hwang Project	3:35
2.	"Christmas for All" (Inst.)		3:35

Jelly Christmas 2012 HEART PROJECT
No.	Title	Artists	Length
1.	"Because It's Christmas" (크리스마스니까; Keuliseumaseunikka)	Sung Si-kyung, Park Hyo-shin, Lee Seok-hoon, Seo In Guk, VIXX	3:45
2.	"Because It's Christmas" (Instrumental)		3:45

겨울 고백 (Jelly Christmas 2013)
No.	Title	Artists	Length
1.	"Winter Confession" (겨울고백: Gyeoulgobaeg)	VIXX, Sung Si-kyung, Park Hyo-shin, Seo In Guk, Little Sister	4:06

Jelly Christmas 2015 – 4랑
No.	Title	Artists	Length
1.	"Love In The Air" (사랑난로; Salangnanlo)	Seo In-guk, VIXX, Park Jung-ah, Park Yoon-ha	4:20
2.	"Love In The Air" (Inst.)		4:20

Jelly Christmas 2016
No.	Title	Artists	Length
1.	"Falling" (니가 내려와; Niga Naelyeowa) (Translation: "You come down")	Seo In-guk, VIXX, Gugudan, Park Yoon-ha, Park Jung-ah, Kim Gyu-sun, Kim Ye-won, Jiyul	4:09
2.	"Falling" (Inst.)		4:09

== Release history ==
Single	Region	Format	Date	Label
Jelly Christmas	South Korea, worldwide	digital download	December 6, 2010	Jellyfish Entertainment
Jelly Christmas 2011	South Korea, worldwide	digital download	December 2, 2011	Jellyfish Entertainment
Jelly Christmas 2012 Heart Project	South Korea, worldwide	digital download	December 5, 2012	Jellyfish Entertainment
겨울 고백 (Jelly Christmas 2013)	South Korea, worldwide	digital download	December 12, 2013	Jellyfish Entertainment
Jelly Christmas 2015 – 4랑	South Korea, worldwide	digital download	December 15, 2015	Jellyfish Entertainment
Jelly Christmas 2016	South Korea, worldwide	digital download	December 13, 2016	Jellyfish Entertainment

== Chart performance ==
Year	Title	Peak position	Album	Sales (DL)
Year	Title	KOR Gaon	Album	Sales (DL)
2010	"Christmas Time"	25	Jelly Christmas 2010	—
2011	"Christmas for All" (모두에게 크리스마스)	27	Jelly Christmas 2011	KOR: 407,544+
2012	"Because It's Christmas" (크리스마스니까)	1	Jelly Christmas 2012 Heart Project	KOR: 946,388+
2013	"Winter Confession" (겨울고백)	1	겨울 고백 (Jelly Christmas 2013)	KOR: 649,150+
2015	"Love In The Air" (사랑난로)	14	Jelly Christmas 2015 – 4랑	KOR: 118,386+
2016	"Falling" (니가 내려와)	34	Jelly Christmas 2016	KOR: 52,439+
