= Yoo Seung-woo =

Yoo Seung-woo 유승우
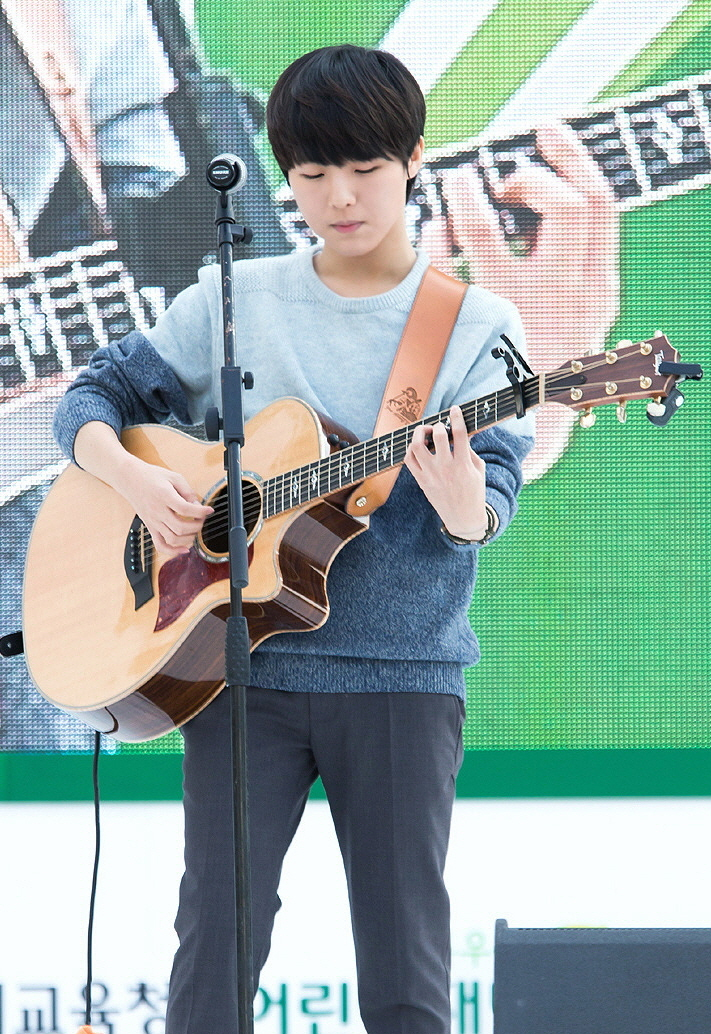
- Yoo in 2014

Background information
- Born: Yoo Seung-woo; February 26, 1997 (age 29); Cheonan, South Korea
- Origin: Seoul, South Korea
- Genres: Pop rock; Folk rock; Ballad
- Occupations: Singer-songwriter; Guitarist
- Years active: 2012–present
- Labels: UK Muzik (2012–2015); Starship Y (2015–2020); Highline (2020–2024); Papermode (2024–present)

Yoo Seung-woo, also stylised Yu Seung Woo (Korean: 유승우, born February 26, 1997), is a South Korean singer-songwriter and guitarist.

== Career ==
=== 2012–2014: Superstar K4 and debut ===
In 2012, Yoo Seung-woo made his television debut when he competed in Mnet's Superstar K4, where he finished in the top six.

On May 3, 2013, he released his music video to "Hello," the title track of his first mini album, The First Picnic. He released The First Picnic on May 8, 2013. One year later, he released the music video for "Hesitating Lips" the title track of his second album Already 19 on February 9, 2014.

=== 2015-present: Starship Entertainment ===
In January 2015, Yoo collaborated with hip-hop artist Mad Clown, which attracted attention for its mixing of hip-hop and acoustic music. In February, Yoo signed to Starship Entertainment's acoustic sublabel, "Starship Y".

In September 2020, Starship announced that Yoo had moved to a different subsidiary label when renewing his contract, moving from Starship Y to Highline Entertainment.

== Discography ==
=== Studio albums ===
Title	Album details	Peak chart positions	Sales
Title	Album details	KOR	Sales
Yoo Seung Woo	Released: September 4, 2014; Label: UK Muzik; Format: CD, digital download; Track list: 1. Intro; 2. 나 말고 모두 다 (Everyone Else but Me); 3. 아름다운 노래 (Beautiful Song); 4. Love; 5. 밤이 아까워서 (Because Night Is So Precious) (Clean Version); 6. 권태기 – 연인송 (Gwontaegi – Lovers Song) (feat. Hyeyeon); 7. 학창시절 (School Days); 8. 아프지 마요 (Don't Hurt) (어머니/Mother) – 부모님송 (Parent's Song); 9. 무법자 (Outlaw); 10. 밤이 아까워서 (Because Night Is So Precious) (Band Version)	15	KOR: 1,499
Yoo Seung Woo 2	Released: May 8, 2019; Label: Starship Entertainment; Format: CD, digital download; Track list: 1. 그대로; 2. 어릴 적엔; 3. 동네; 4. 그대 (feat. Minseo); 5. 내일; 6. 너의 나 7. He ha!; 8. 바람; 9. Good Night; 10. 꿈	44	—N/a

=== Extended plays ===
Title	Album details	Peak chart positions	Sales
Title	Album details	KOR	Sales
The First Picnic (첫 번째 소풍)	Released: May 8, 2013; Label: UK Muzik; Format: CD, digital download; Track list: 1. 소풍 (Intro); 2. 너와 나 (You and I); 3. 헬로 (Hello); 4. 한심한 남자가 부르는 노래 (The Love Song Sung by a Pathetic Guy); 5. 서툰 사랑 (Clumsy Love); 6. 헬로 (Hello) (Inst.); 7. 서툰 사랑 (Clumsy Love) (Inst.)	8	KOR: 2,300
Already 19 (빠른 열아홉)	Released: February 10, 2014; Label: UK Muzik; Format: CD, digital download; Track list: 1. 입술이 밉다 (Hesitating Lips); 2. Hello My World; 3. Baby Is U 4. 그날 (That Day); 5. 유후 (U Who?) (feat. San E); 6. 입술이 밉다 (Hesitating Lips) (Inst.); 7. Baby Is U (Inst.)	14	KOR: 2,114
Pit a Pat	Released: February 2, 2016; Label: Starship Entertainment; Format: CD, digital download; Track list: 1. 뭐 어때 (Whatever) (feat. Crucial Star); 2. 점점 좋아집니다 (It Is Getting Better); 3. 선 (45.7cm) (feat. Oohyo); 4. 스무살 (Twenty); 5. 예뻐서 (You're Beautiful) (feat. Louie)	19	KOR: 583
Romance	Released: November 23, 2017; Label: Starship Entertainment; Format: CD, digital download; Track list: 1. Romance; 2. 더 (Anymore); 3. 500일의 썸머 (500 Days of Summer); 4. 원해널 (Want You); 5. 사랑해요 (I Love You) (feat. Lovey); 6. 오늘밤엔 (Tonight)	47	—N/a

=== Singles ===
==== As lead artist ====
Title	Year	Peak chart positions	Sales	Album
Title	Year	KOR	Sales	Album
"Hello" (헬로)	2013	12	KOR: 379,571	The First Picnic
"You and I" (너와 나)	2013	19	KOR: 350,443	The First Picnic
"U Who?" (유후) feat. San E	2013	5	KOR: 261,271	Already 19
"Hesitating Lips" (입술이 밉다)	2014	15	KOR: 139,383	Already 19
"Because Night Is So Precious" (밤이 아까워서)	2014	42	KOR: 85,510	Yoo Seung Woo
"Everyone Else But Me" (나 말고 모두 다)	2014	—	KOR: 22,322	Yoo Seung Woo
"Take My Hand" feat. Sungha Jung	2015	—	KOR: 17,103	Non-album single
"You're Beautiful" (예뻐서) feat. Louie	2015	16	KOR: 417,510	Pit a Pat
"45.7cm" (선) feat. Oohyo	2016	21	KOR: 186,144	Pit a Pat
"Whatever" (뭐 어때) feat. Crucial Star	2016	33	KOR: 106,220	Pit a Pat
"Only U" (너만이) feat. Heize	2016	20	KOR: 95,542	Non-album single
"Tonight" (오늘밤엔)	2017	—	—N/a	Romance
"Anymore" (더)	2017	—	KOR: 14,179	Romance
"Slowly" (천천히)	2018	—	—N/a	Non-album single
"Always" (그대로)	2018	—	—N/a	Yoo Seung Woo 2
"Dream" (꿈)	2018	—	—N/a	Yoo Seung Woo 2
"Still Here" (너의 나)	2019	—	—N/a	Yoo Seung Woo 2
"The Road You Take" (서울살이)	2019	—	—N/a	Non-album single
"—" denotes release did not chart.

==== As featured artist ====
Year	Single	Album
2012	"My Son" (Kim Gun Mo)	Superstar K4 Top 12 Pt. 1
2012	"열정" (Se7en)	Superstar K4 Top 12 Pt. 2
2012	"말하는 대로" (처진 달팽이)	Superstar K4 Top 12 Pt. 3
2012	"Butterfly" (Jason Mraz)	Superstar K4 Top 12 Pt. 4
2012	"Sing a Song"	It's Top 12
2014	"니가 오는 날"	Two Weeks OST Pt. 3
2014	"어떡하나요"	Cunning Single Lady OST Pt. 1
2014	"사랑해 들리지가 않니"	Jang Bori Is Here! OST Pt. 6
2014	"I'll Give You My Life"	The Technicians OST
2019	"Fake" (거짓말이네)	Be Melodramatic OST Pt. 4
2019	"The Whole Night" (온 밤)	Dream 夢
2020	"Luv Luv Baby"	Lonely Enough to Love OST Pt. 2

=== Collaborations ===
Year	Single	Other artist(s)	Album
2014	"너 그리고 너"	Tarin	Tarin's Collaboration Project Part.1
2016	"여름밤피크닉 (Summer Night's Picnic)"	Park Yoon Ha	Jelly Box
2016	"사랑이 뭔데 (What Is Love)"	Seo Hyun Jin	Another Oh Hae-young OST
2016	"잠은 다 잤나봐요 (No Sleep)"	Soyou	Love in the Moonlight OST
2017	"티가나 (Can't Stop This Feeling)"	Younha	Can't Stop This Feeling – Single

== Filmography ==
Year	Title	Notes
2014	Superstar K4	Top 6 Contestant
2016	King of Mask Singer	Contestant as "Tightrope Life The King's Man" (episodes 61, 62)

== Theater ==
Year	English title	Korean title	Role	Ref.
2022–2023	Dracula	드라큘라	Dimitru	

== Awards and nominations ==
Year presented, name of the award ceremony, award category, nominated work and the result of the nomination
Year	Award-Giving Body	Category	Nominated work	Result	Ref.
2013	Mnet Asian Music Awards	Best New Male Artist	–	Nominated	
