= Zia (singer) =

South Korean singer

- Born: Park Ji Hye; July 21, 1986 (age 40); Seoul, South Korea
- Occupation: Singer
- Musical career
- Genres: K-pop; Ballad
- Years active: 2007–present
- Label: Kakao M

- Korean name
- Hangul: 박지혜
- RR: Bak Jihye
- MR: Pak Chihye

Stage name
- Hangul: 지아
- RR: Jia
- MR: Chia

Park Ji Hye (born July 21, 1986), better known by her stage name Zia, is a South Korean singer.

== History ==
=== Pre-debut ===
Zia's first foray into the music industry was when she participated in the 2003 'BoA-jjang Contest' where she placed first overall. In 2005, she was featured on KCM's song '물론' for his second album. Later on that year, she released a song for the soundtrack of the Korean movie, Shadowless Sword.

=== 2007–2008: Debut ===
Zia released her debut album Voice of Heaven through the agency Taewon Entertainment in July 2007. Her leading single was the ballad 물끄러미, which was greeted with great success. Her follow-up singles included 내마음별과같이 (Feat. KCM) and 수호천사. In November, she was featured in the compilation album titled Violin. Other well known artists featured on the album included Seeya, KCM, and Song SeungHeon.

In the beginning of 2008, she was asked to participate in Cho Young Soo's All Star album series. SG Wannabe were also featured on the album. Her second full album, Road Movie was released in July, and was again met with much critical acclaim. The leading single for the album was titled 'I Love You, I'm Sorry' and the music video featured actor Shin Hyun Jun. He also participated in the music videos for the album's other two singles, 난 행복해 and 뭉클.

=== 2009–2010: Transfer to LOEN ===
After releasing her mini album titled Orchestra, Zia left her agency and was signed to LOEN Entertainment. She released a digital single and another mini album in December, with the first single, 'Have a Drink', being banned for those under the age of 19 because of reference to alcohol consumption. Despite the ban, the song was still met with much success.

Zia started 2010 by releasing another digital single, titled 'Bad Habit'. She began going out and promoting again with the release of the mini album Difference, with the music video of the lead single, 'Just Laugh', including the actor Shin Hak Yun. After the success of 'Just Laugh', she finished up the year by releasing a collaborative single with the ballad group 4men and another mini album.

=== 2011–present: Other activities and further releases ===
After participating in the soundtracks for the popular TV shows Listen to My Heart and Can't Lose, Zia prepared for the release of her second full album, Avancer. The song 'Hope it's With You' was released as a digital single before the album's release as a hype song. After finishing up promotions for the album, she released a digital single that was a response to her previous song, 'Have a Drink'.

Zia spent most of 2012 out of the spotlight, with her only activities being a song for the Dr. Jin soundtrack and a collaboration with fellow ballad singer Huh Gak. Their single, 'I Need You' managed to secure a number one spot despite lack of promotions. She also participated in her label's artist album Loen Tree Summer Story. Her track was a duet with label mates Sunny Hill.

== Discography ==
=== Studio albums ===
Title	Album details	Peak chart positions	Sales
Title	Album details	KOR	Sales
Road Movie (로드무비)	Released: July 14, 2008; Label: Taewon Entertainment; Format: CD; Track listing: 1. 난 행복해; 2. 나 어떡해; 3. 사랑해 미안해; 4. 먼발치; 5. 그대만 보여요 (feat. TOP of Big Bang); 6. 사랑만 알아서; 7. 엄마 미안해요; 8. 웃어줄래; 9. 뭉클; 10. 신촌에서 홍대까지; 11. 별 12. 우두커니; 13. 가까스로; 14. 고백; 15. 낡은 옷 16. 사랑해 미안해 (piano version)	—	—N/a
Avancer	Released: September 30, 2011; Label: LOEN Entertainment; Format: CD, digital download; Track listing: 1. 내가 이렇지 (feat. Ha Dong-kyun); 2. 누가 거짓말했나요; 3. 이건 내 노래; 4. 헤어진 첫날; 5. 사랑을 적어요 (with Mir of MBLAQ); 6. 집에 있을 거에요; 7. 스물네 시간 (with Park Jung-ah); 8. 딱 한번만 더 9. 그대이길 바래요 (with K.Will)	10	KOR: 2,438
11 Days Have Passed (11일이 지나고)	Released: January 13, 2014; Label: LOEN Entertainment; Format: CD, digital download; Track listing: 1. 울어본 적 있나요 (Have You Ever Cried); 2. 아프다 아프다 (feat. LE of EXID); 3. 그까짓 사랑 때문에; 4. 이별 참 쉽더라; 5. 그리운 날에; 6. 이별했다; 7. 거짓말; 8. 그런 줄 알았어; 9. 이별남녀 (with Seo In-guk); 10. 사랑했었다면 (with Lee Hae-ri of Davichi); 11. 나 이런 여자예요 (feat. Yezi of Fiestar)	20	KOR: 999

=== Extended plays ===
Title	Album details	Peak chart positions	Sales
Title	Album details	KOR	Sales
Voice of Heaven	Released: July 16, 2007; Label: Taewon Entertainment; Format: CD, cassette; Track listing: 1. 물끄러미; 2. 내마음별과같이 (feat. KCM); 3. 수호천사; 4. 사랑은창밖의빗물같아요; 5. 물론; 6. 물끄러미 (piano version)	—	—N/a
Orchestra	Released: April 2, 2009; Label: Happy Entertainment; Format: CD; Track listing: 1. 그런다면서; 2. 터질 것 같아; 3. 사랑끄트머리 (feat. Jang Geun-lee); 4. 사랑에 미쳐서; 5. 문자로 이별하는 일 6. 전할 수 없는 말	—N/a	—N/a
Atelier	Released: December 28, 2009; Label: LOEN Entertainment; Format: CD; Track listing: 1. 잊으면 안돼; 2. 그녀처럼; 3. 그 날 이후부터; 4. 사랑해 줘요; 5. 술 한잔 해요	4	—N/a
Difference	Released: August 6, 2010; Label: LOEN Entertainment; Format: CD, digital download; Track listing: 1. 웃음만..; 2. 시간아 부탁할게 (feat. Yeon-ji of SeeYa); 3. 불감; 4. 믿고 싶어; 5. 잘 가..지 마 6. 사랑을 가르쳐 주세요 (feat. K.Will)	9	—N/a
Falling Tears in Winter (겨울에 내리는 눈물)	Released: December 23, 2010; Label: LOEN Entertainment; Format: CD, digital download; Track listing: 1. 돈이 많이 생기면; 2. 왜 내가 아파; 3. 가지 말아요; 4. 감기 때문에; 5. 몇 월 며칠 몇 시 (feat. Mighty Mouth)	22	—N/a
Anemone	Released: December 10, 2012; Label: LOEN Entertainment; Format: CD, digital download; Track listing: 1. 방문을 잠그고; 2. 일 년째; 3. 눈물이 툭 (feat. Kyung of Block B); 4. 나를 잊어도; 5. I Need You (with Huh Gak)	12	KOR: 1,377
Falling in Fall	Released: October 6, 2014; Label: LOEN Entertainment; Format: CD, digital download; Track listing: 1. 웃게 해줄게; 2. Falling in Love (with Hwanhee of Fly to the Sky); 3. 무릎담요; 4. 밥 한 숟갈; 5. 잊어버린 채 살아; 6. 보란 듯이; 7. Falling in Love (Inst.); 8. 보란 듯이 (Inst.)	14	KOR: 833

=== Singles ===
Title	Year	Peak chart positions	Album
Title	Year	KOR	Album
"Gazing Blankly" (물끄러미)	2007	—N/a	Voice of Heaven
"My Heart Is Like a Star" (내 마음 별과 같이) with KCM	2007	—N/a	Voice of Heaven
"Guardian Angel" (수호천사)	2007	—N/a	Voice of Heaven
"I Love You, I'm Sorry" (사랑해 미안해)	2008	—N/a	Road Movie
"I Am Happy" (난 행복해)	2008	—N/a	Road Movie
"Full-hearted" (뭉클)	2008	—N/a	Road Movie
"Feel Like Exploding" (터질 것 같아)	2009	—N/a	Orchestra
"Have a Drink" (술 한잔 해요)	2009	5	Atelier
"Like Her" (그녀처럼)	2009	15	Atelier
"Bad Habit" (나쁜 버릇)	2010	6	Non-album single
"Just Laugh" (웃음만)	2010	4	Difference
"Crying, Calling" (울고, 불고) with 4Men	2010	4	Falling Tears in Winter
"Don't Go" (가지 말아요)	2010	10	Falling Tears in Winter
"Hope It's You" (그대이길 바래요) with K.Will	2011	3	Avancer
"The Way I Am" (내가 이렇지) feat. Ha Dong-kyun	2011	6	Avancer
"The First Day After Breaking Up" (헤어진 첫날)	2011	21	Avancer
"Depressed" (속상해서)	2011	4	Non-album single
"I Need You" with Huh Gak	2012	1	Anemone
"Tears Falling Down" (눈물이 툭) with Park Kyung	2012	9	Anemone
"For A Year" (일 년째)	2012	5	Anemone
"With Coffee" with Jang Han-byul	2013	33	Non-album single
"If You Loved Me" (사랑했었다면) with Lee Hae-ri	2013	5	11 Days Have Passed
"Loved You" (이별남녀) with Seo In-guk	2013	1	11 Days Have Passed
"To Be Expected" (그런 줄 알았어)	2013	4	11 Days Have Passed
"Have You Ever Cried?" (울어본 적 있나요)	2014	17	11 Days Have Passed
"Pretend to be Okay" (보란 듯이)	2014	13	Falling in Fall
"Falling in Love" with Hwanhee	2014	33	Falling in Fall
"Rumor" (나쁜 소문)	2014	22	Non-album single
"Missing You" (혼잣말) with HeartB	2015	28	Remember
"It's Raining" (비가 내려와) with Lee Hyun	2015	42	Non-album singles
"Nostalgic Autumn" (가을타나 봐) with Hong Dae-kwang	2015	41	Non-album singles
"Tears" (눈물)	2016	51	Non-album singles
"Farewell Ridden" (이별쟁이)	2016	86	Non-album singles
"I Know Myself Well" (내가 나를 잘 아니까)	2016	—	Non-album singles
"Have a Drink Today" (술 한잔해요 오늘)	2016	13	Non-album singles
"Speaking Habit" (말버릇) with KCM	2017	98	Non-album singles
"Sad Eyes" (시선 (당신이 싫어요))	2017	—	Non-album singles
"I'll Be Your Light" (별이될게) with DK	2017	—	Non-album singles
"Dear My Fool" (바보에게 바보가)	2017	9	Non-album singles
"A Cup of Memory" (추억 한 잔) with Monday Kiz, feat. Hareem	2018	—	Non-album singles
"Even Though Me" (이런 나라도 괜찮나요)	2018	—	Non-album singles
"My December" (나의 12월)	2018	—	Non-album singles
"If I Were Also a Man" (나도 남자였다면)	2019	—	Non-album singles
"Half" (니가 길게 혼자면 좋겠어)	2019	87	Non-album singles
"Become Someone's" (누군가의 무엇이 되어)	2021	—	River Where the Moon Rises OST Part 1
"Snowflake" (눈꽃)	2021	153	The Last Make-Up
"Even If I Can't Have You" (가질 수 없어도)	2022	—	Kiss Sixth Sense OST Part 2
"Drunken Night" (술이 뭐길래) with Huh Gak	2022	74	Non-album singles
"The Day After" (오늘부터 1일) with Jeongwook Park	2022	157	Non-album singles
"Tired of Falling in Love" (사랑하기 싫어)	2023	8	Non-album singles
"Love..What Is It" (사랑..그게 뭔데)	2023	22	Non-album singles
"Because You Don't Love Me" (사랑하지 않아서 그랬니)	2023	57	Non-album singles
"It Just Happened" (그냥 그렇게 됐어)	2023	125	Non-album singles
"Because of Love" (사랑을 하기는 했나 봐) with Huh Gak	2024	138	Non-album singles
"Heartbreaking Love" (지독하게 가슴 아픈 사랑)	2025	200	Non-album singles
"—" denotes release did not chart.

== Awards and nominations ==
Award	Year	Category	Nominee / nominated work	Result	Ref.
Gaon Chart K-Pop Awards	2013	Artist of the Year for December (Digital)	"Loved You" (with Seo In-guk)	Won	
Golden Disc Awards	2008	Rookie of the Year (Album Category)	Road Movie	Nominated	
Korean Entertainment Arts Awards	2008	Best Ballad Singer	Zia	Won	
Korean Entertainment Arts Awards	2015	Best Ballad Singer	Zia	Won	
Mnet Asian Music Awards	2012	Best Collaboration	"I Need You" (with Huh Gak)	Nominated	
Mnet Asian Music Awards	2014	Best Collaboration	"Loved You" (with Seo In-guk)	Nominated	
