= Love&Love =

- Digital cover

Single album by Seo In-guk
- Released: June 14, 2022
- Genres: Pop; R&B
- Length: 10:15
- Languages: Korean; English
- Label: AER Music
- Producer: Seo
- Compilers: Park Kyung-hyun; Seo Jeong-jin

Seo In-guk chronology
Last Song (2015)	Love&Love (2022)	Seo In Guk (2024)

Love&Love is the first single album by South Korean singer and actor Seo In-guk. It was released on June 14, 2022, by AER Music. The album consists of three tracks, including the title track, "My Love".

== Background ==
It has been five years since Seo last released music with the digital single Better Together.

Fronted by the single My Love, a collaboration with rapper Ravi, the single album also contains the nostalgia-inducing Be My Melody, with both tracks produced by Seo's writing team, Seo Ssi Nae.

== Commercial performance ==
The single album sold 10,000+ copies in South Korea. It peaked at number 47 on the Korean Gaon Chart.

== Track listing ==
No.	Title	Lyrics	Music	Length
1.	"My Love" (feat. Ravi)	Seo; Ravi	Seo	3:26
2.	"Be My Melody" (질리지 않는 노래)	Seo; Kim Ji-hyang	Seo; Seo Jeong-jin	3:26
3.	"My Love" (Inst.)		Seo	3:26
Total length:				10:15

== Charts ==
=== Monthly charts ===
Monthly chart performance for Love Race
Chart (2022)	Position
South Korean Albums (Circle)	47
