= Kim Ye-won (entertainer) =

South Korean actress (born 1989)

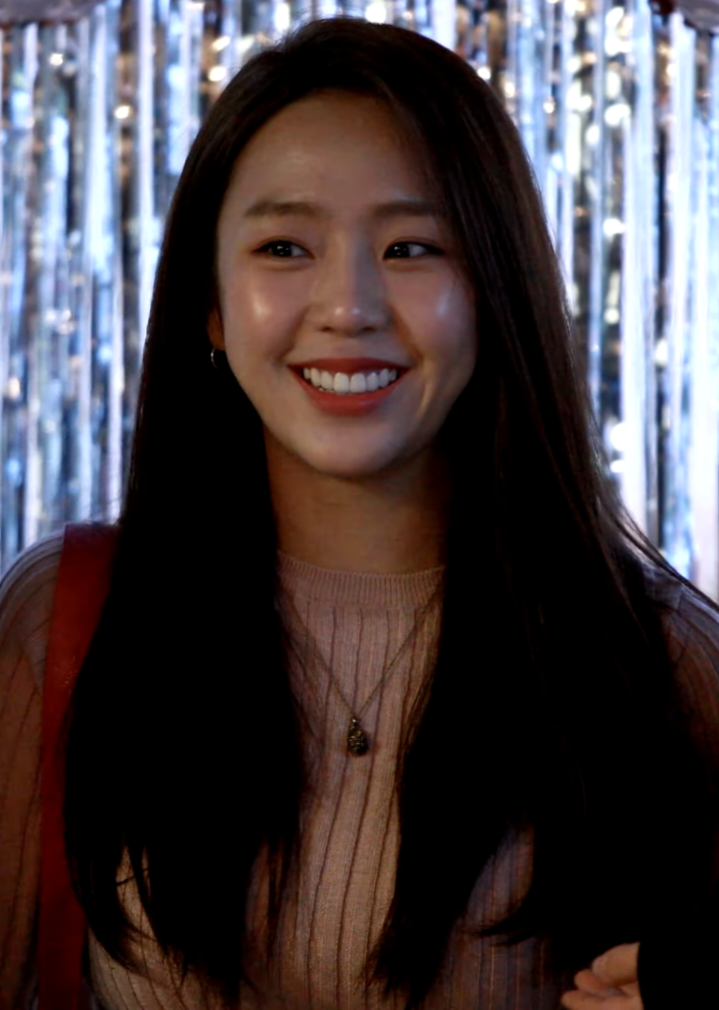
- Kim in November 2019
- Born: December 5, 1989 (age 36); South Jeolla Province, South Korea
- Education: Myongji College – Applied Music
- Occupations: Actress; singer; entertainer
- Years active: 2011–present
- Agent: Andmarq
- Musical career
- Genre: K-pop
- Instrument: Vocals
- Years active: 2011–2015
- Label: Star Empire
- Formerly of: Jewelry

Korean name
- Hangul: 김예원
- Hanja: 金藝元
- RR: Gim Yewon
- MR: Kim Yewŏn

Kim Ye-won (Korean: 김예원; born December 5, 1989), also known mononymously as Yewon, is a South Korean actress, singer and entertainer. She was a former member of K-pop girl group Jewelry from 2011 until they disbanded in 2015. Alongside her singing career, she appeared on television in dramas, sitcoms and variety shows.

== Early life and education ==
Kim Ye-won was born in South Jeolla Province, South Korea. She attended Myongji College where she studied Applied Music.

== Career ==
=== 2011–2014: Debut with Jewelry, minor acting roles ===
Kim made her debut on 8 January 2011, with Star Empire Entertainment's girl group Jewelry. A digital single, "Back It Up" was released on January 27 along with its accompanying music video. Kim made her first appearance on stage with the performance on M! Countdown.

On 20 September 2011, Kim, together with bandmate Semi, formed a sub-unit called Jewelry S. They debuted with "Ames Room Vol.2", the title track being the song "Forget It".

Soon after her debut with Jewelry S, she was invited to join her first variety show as a cast member on Invincible Youth. Kim also landed her first acting role in the SBS Plus drama, Oh My God. Kim also played some minor roles in Standby and Reply 1997.

Kim made her film debut in Gladiators of Rome with Korean dubbing.

=== 2015–present: Disbandment of Jewelry, solo activities ===
On January 7, 2015, the group was officially confirmed as disbanded.

After the disbandment of the group, Kim joined the reality programme titled We Got Married, pairing with Canadian-born singer and actor, Henry Lau.

In November 2016, Kim left Star Empire Entertainment and joined Jellyfish Entertainment as an actress. She later signed Jellyfish Entertainment in November 2016.

On December 13, 2016, together with other Jellyfish Entertainment's artists such as Seo In-guk, VIXX, Gugudan, Park Yoon-ha, Park Jung-ah, Kim Gyu-sun, and Jiyul, released their Jelly Christmas 2016 single album with the song, "Falling", as part of their digital music channel project Jelly Box.

In 2018, Kim joined the cast of What's Wrong with Secretary Kim.

In 2022, she signed a contract with Andmarq in May 2022.

== Controversies ==
In March 2015, while filming the Korean TV show My Tutor Friend, Lee Tae-im and Kim had a fight, with Lee reportedly swearing at Kim. After the incident, Lee claimed that Kim initiated the fight by using informal speech to address her, as informal speech is considered rude to be used while addressing older people and seniors in Korean culture. Despite her claims, Lee received public backlash, which caused her to withdraw from My Tutor Friend and other TV shows she was in. She publicly apologized to Kim and announced hiatus.

However, less than a month later, video footage of Lee and Kim quarreling began circulating on the internet, proving Lee's claims that Kim used informal speech to address her. This caused the public sentiment to shift, with Kim's remarks from the footage becoming a subject of various parodies. After the backlash, Kim ultimately apologized to Lee.

== Discography ==
=== Collaborations ===
Year	Song title	Artist	Notes
2011	"Bad Habits"	Soul Dive feat. Yewon	Track 6 from EP Bad Habits
2011	"I Can Only See You"	Yewon and Hwang Kwanghee	Track 5 from Protect the Boss OST
2011	"5 Minute Standby"	Jiggy Dogg feat. Yewon	Single
2012	"Destiny Love"	Park Se-mi and Kim Ye-won	Standby OST Part 1 single
2016	"Falling" (니가 내려와)	With Seo In-guk, VIXX, Gugudan, Park Yoon-ha, Park Jung-ah, Kim Gyu-sun, Jiyul	Jelly Christmas 2016

== Filmography ==
=== Film ===
Year	Title	Role	Notes
2013	Gladiators of Rome 3D	Diana	voice, Korean dubbing

=== Television series ===
Year	Title	Role	Notes	Ref.
2011	Oh My God	Kim Ye-won		
2012	Oh My God 2	Kim Ye-won		
2012	Standby	Kim Ye-won		
2012	Reply 1997	Sung Song-joo	Cameo / Episode 3-4 and 9	
2013	The Clinic for Married Couples: Love and War	Yoo Eun-chae	Episode 62 "Fair Love"	
2013	Pure Love	PE trainee teacher	Cameo	
2013	Miss Korea	Lee Young-sun		
2014	Hotel King	Yoon Da-jung		
2014	Plus Nine Boys	Music program host/radio DJ	Cameo (Episode 1)	
2018	What's Wrong with Secretary Kim	Sul Ma-eum		
2018	Feel Good to Die	Yoo-mi		
2019	Class of Lies	Sin Hye-soo		
2020	She Knows Everything	Women's society manager		
2020–2021	Run On	Choi Tae-ri		
2024	Wedding Impossible	Ahn Se jin		
2025	Nine Puzzles	Lee Mi-young	Cameo	
2025	My Girlfriend Is the Man!	Mina unnie	Cameo	

=== Web series ===
Year	Title	Role	Ref.
2022	Narco-Saints	Jeon Yo-hwan's wife	

=== Television shows ===
Year	Title	Role	Notes	Ref.
2011–2013	Gourmet Road			
2011	Idol Chart Show			
2011	Star King			
2011	Young Street	DJ		
2011–2012	Invincible Youth - Season 2	Cast member		
2012–2013	The Romantic & Idol - Season 2			
2013	Awkward School			
2013	Millionaire Game: My Turn			
2013	Chuseok Special: Star Love Village			
2014	A Celebrity Is Living in Our House			
2014	Awkward School 2			
2014	The Tree That Won't Fall; Even If You Strike It 10 Times			
2015	My House	Host		
2015	Three Wheels			
2015	Hiking with You			
2015	We Got Married Season 4	Cast member	with Henry Lau	
2016	Saturday Night Live Korea	Cast member		
