= Park Jung-ah =

South Korean entertainer (born 1981)

- 박정아
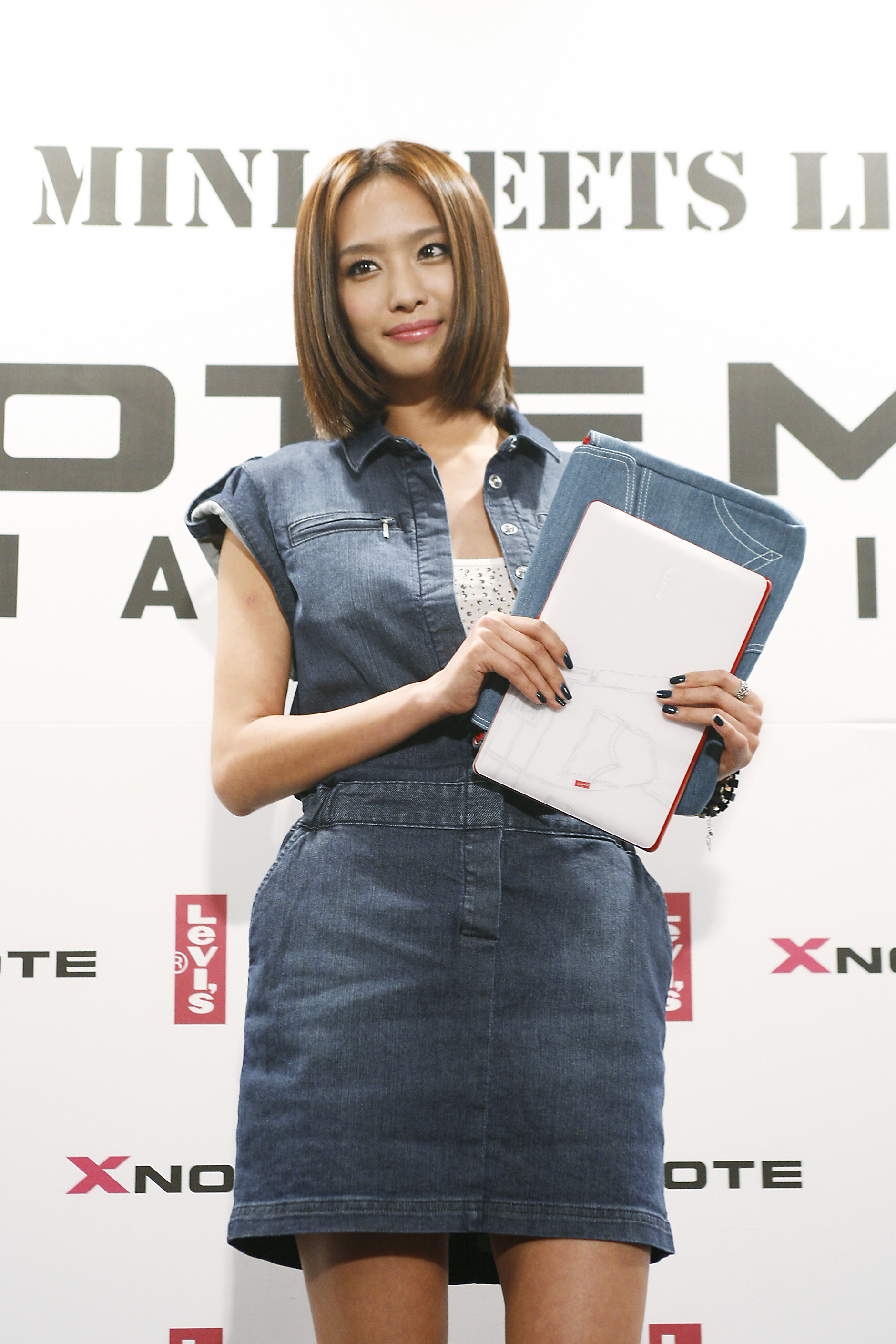
- Park in 2009
- Born: February 24, 1981 (age 45); Yeongcheon, South Korea
- Education: Dongduk Women's University
- Occupations: Singer; actress; entertainer; radio DJ
- Years active: 2001–present
- Agents: Star Empire; WM Company; Jellyfish
- Spouse: Jeon Sang-woo (m. 2016)
- Children: 1
- Musical career
- Genres: K-pop; pop rock; dance-pop
- Formerly of: Jewelry; M.M.D

Korean name
- Hangul: 박정아
- Hanja: 朴貞雅
- RR: Bak Jeonga
- MR: Pak Chŏnga

Park Jung-ah (Korean: 박정아; also spelled as Park Jeong-ah, Park JungA; February 24, 1981) is a South Korean singer, actress, entertainer, and radio DJ.

== Career ==
=== 2000–2014: Career beginnings, breakthrough success and Jewelry ===
Park graduated from Dongduk Women's University with a bachelor's degree in Applied Musicology and is also able to play the piano.

First debuting as a member of the girl group Jewelry in 2001, she became the group leader. In 2003, she debuted as an actress and has since appeared in a handful of movies and dramas.

Since Jewelry went on hiatus, Park took the opportunity to debut as a solo singer. Her first solo album Yeah was released in the fall of 2006, showing an edgier side that Jewelry single "Superstar" hinted at. The title song Produced and Co-Written by Hit American Producers Ian (iRok) Scott and Mark (MJ) Jackson A.K.A. MJ&iRoK was her first single, and it allowed Park to become more of a rock singer. The album also featured production from #1 Billboard Producer, Eddie Galan of Mach 1 Music. To move away from the manufactured pop image she developed in Jewelry, she has performed this single live at every performance, and it has subsequently made the song a strong chart hit.

From November 2006 to 2009, she had been hosting her own radio show, On a Starry Night.

In 2013, Jung-ah left Star Empire and entered a new contract with WM Company. Their new partnership was announced on May 10, 2013.

=== 2014–present: Solo activities and acting ===
In June 2014, Park released Because of You which is part of South Korean drama Doctor Stranger's OST.

On December 15, 2015 Jellyfish Entertainment released their Jelly Christmas 2015 – 4랑 single album featuring the song, "Love In The Air" (Korean: 사랑난로). The announced participating the Jellyfish artists were Park Jung-ah, Seo In-guk, VIXX, and former K-pop Star 4 contestant Park Yoon-ha. The single placed at 14 on the digital Gaon Chart.

Park participated in Jellyfish Entertainment's winter project, Jelly Christmas 2016, with her label mates Seo In-guk, VIXX, Gugudan, Park Yoon-ha, Kim Gyu-sun, Kim Ye-won and Jiyul. The title track, "Falling" (Korean: 니가 내려와) was released digitally on December 13, 2016.

== Personal life ==
Park was diagnosed with thyroid cancer and received surgery to remove a cancerous tumor in May 2013.

On May 15, 2016, Park married pro-golfer Jeon Sang-woo and gave birth to a daughter in March, 2019.

== Filmography ==
=== Film ===
Year	Title	Role
2003	Madeleine	Hong Sung-hae
2005	Murder, Take One	Han Moo-sook
2008	Frivolous Wife	Cheon Yeon-soo

=== Television series ===
Year	Title	Role
2004	When a Man Loves a Woman	In-hye
2010	Prosecutor Princess	Jenny Ahn
2010–2011	Smile Again	Yoon Sae-wa
2011	KBS Drama Special: "The Woman from the Olle Road"	Kim Young-joo
2011–2012	My One and Only	Cha Do-hee
2012–2013	Seoyoung, My Daughter	Kang Mi-kyung
2013–2014	My Love from the Star	No Seo-young (ep.4)
2014	The Noblesse	Lee Mi-na
2015	Oh My Ghost	Lee So-hyung
2015–2016	Glamorous Temptation	Lee Se-young
2017	The Secret of My Love	Jin Hae-rim
2018	Kodoku no Gourmet	Park Soo-Young
2019	Leverage	Choi Se-ri
2024	The Midnight Studio	Kang Soo-mi

== Discography ==
=== Studio albums ===
- Yeah (released on August 25, 2006)

=== Collaborations ===
Year	Title	Peak position	Other artist(s)	Album
Year	Title	KOR	Other artist(s)	Album
2015	"Love In The Air" (사랑난로)	14	Seo In-guk, VIXX, Park Yoon-ha	Jelly Christmas 2015 – 4랑
2016	"Falling" (니가 내려와)	34	Seo In-guk, VIXX, Gugudan, Park Yoon-ha, Kim Gyu-sun, Kim Ye-won, Jiyul	Jelly Christmas 2016

== Show hosting ==
=== Television show ===
Year	Program
2002	Live Wow!
2003	Music Bank
2003	Time Machine
2003	TV Entertainment Tonight
2009–2010	Show Your Mind
2021–2022	Mama The Idol
2022	Oliview Show
2022	Olive Show Season 2

=== Radio show ===
Year	Network	Program
2003	KBS FM	I Like Radio
2006–08	MBC FM	On a Starry Night
2015–present	MBC FM	Moonlight Paradise

== Awards and nominations ==
Year	Awards	Category	Nominated work	Result	Ref.
2003	20th Model Line	Korea Best Dresser		Won	
2003	Korea Music Award	This Year's Singer		Won	
2004	SBS Drama Awards		When Man Love	Won	
2005	KBS K-Pop Awards	This Year's Singer		Won	
2006	Mnet KM Music Festival	Best Female Artist	"Yeah"	Nominated	
2007	MBC Drama Awards	Excellence Award in Radio	On a Starry Night	Won	
2011	KBS Drama Awards	Best Supporting Actress	Smile Again	Won	
2012	KBS Drama Awards	Best Supporting Actress	Seoyoung, My Daughter	Nominated	
