= Jiyul (singer) =

South Korean singer and actress (born 1991)

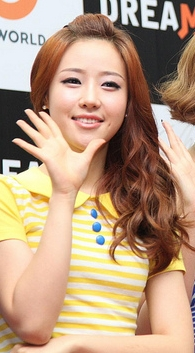
- Yang in July 2011
- Born: Yang Jung-yoon; July 30, 1991 (age 35); Seoul, South Korea
- Education: Dongduk Women's University
- Occupations: Singer; actress
- Years active: 2011–present
- Musical career
- Genre: K-pop
- Instrument: Vocals
- Label: Happy Face
- Formerly of: Dal Shabet

Korean name
- Hangul: 양정윤
- Hanja: 梁正允
- RR: Yang Jeongyun
- MR: Yang Chŏngyun

Stage name
- Hangul: 민지율
- Hanja: 閔祉潏
- RR: Min Jiyul
- MR: Min Chiyul

Yang Jung-yoon (Korean: 양정윤; born July 30, 1991), better known by her stage name Jiyul or Min Ji-yul, is a South Korean singer and actress. As a singer she is best known member of the South Korean girl group Dal Shabet.

== Early life ==
Jiyul was born on July 30, 1991, in Seoul, South Korea. She attended Dongduk Women's University.

== Career ==
=== 2011–2013: Debut with Dal Shabet and solo activities ===
Jiyul made her official debut with her fellow members of Dal Shabet on January 3, 2011. On November 3, 2011, Jiyul became a host for SBS MTV's K-Pop 20.

Jiyul made her acting debut as a cameo appearance in Papa in 2012. She played the role of Mila, a top star Park Yong-woo's character manages, who ran away to America, forcing Park's character to go after her.

Her first major acting role was in the short film Her Story, in which she was cast as the female lead.

She participated in MasterChef Korea Celebrity which premiered on February 22, 2013.

=== 2015: Solo activities and departure from Dal Shabet ===
In July 2015, it was announced that Jiyul would be acting in a web drama series called 'Yotaek', along with fellow Dal Shabet member Ahyoung and Chinese group Hit5's Gao Yu.

In December 2015, Happy Face Entertainment announced that Jiyul and Gaeun had withdrawn from Dal Shabet after their contract with the agency had officially expired, she decided to focus on her acting career.

=== 2016: Acting and solo work ===
On October 19, 2016 Jellyfish Entertainment announced that Jiyul had been signed contract with the agency. Jiyul participated in Jellyfish Entertainment's winter project, Jelly Christmas 2016, with her label mates Seo In-guk, VIXX, Gugudan, Park Yoon-ha, Park Jung-ah, Kim Gyu-sun, and Kim Ye-won. The title track, "Falling" (Korean: 니가 내려와) was released digitally on December 13, 2016.

== Personal life ==
=== Health ===
In 2013, Jiyul suffered from an ankle injury, which resulted in her not being able to join her Dal Shabet co-members in performing at the WAPOP K-Dream Concert (Wow Asia Pop, Korea Dream Concert), held on October 26.

== Filmography ==
=== Film ===
Year	Title	Role	Notes
2012	Papa	Mila	cameo
2012	Her Story	Hanna	short film
2012	Wonderful Radio	Cobi Girl	cameo
2015	Three Summer Night	Herself	
2019	Homme Fatale	Ae Ok	

=== Television drama ===
Year	Title	Role	Network	Notes
2011	Dream High	Kirin student	KBS2	cameo
2013	Fantasy Tower	Yeon-soo	tvN	
2015	Yotaek	Lead Role (Gu-ah)		Web Drama
2017	Wednesday 3:30 PM	Jiyul	SBS Plus	
2017	Bravo My Life	Kim Seohyun	SBS	Supporting role

=== Variety show ===
Year	Title	Network	Notes/Ref.
2011	K-Pop 20	SBS MTV	Host
2011	Happy Together	KBS2	Guest with Subin (January 13)
2013	MasterChef Korea Celebrity	O'live	Contestant

== Discography ==
=== As collaborating artist ===
Year	Title	Peak position	Other artist(s)	Album
Year	Title	KOR Gaon	Other artist(s)	Album
2016	"Falling" (니가 내려와)	34	Seo In-guk, VIXX, Gugudan, Park Yoon-ha, Park Jung-ah, Kim Gyu-sun, Kim Ye-won	Jelly Christmas 2016
