= K-pop Star =

South Korean music audition TV show

- Genre: Reality television
- Presented by: Yoon Do-hyun; Boom; Jun Hyun-moo; Yoo Hye-young; Yura
- Judges: Park Jin-young; Yang Hyun-suk; You Hee-yeol
- Country of origin: South Korea
- Original language: Korean
- No. of seasons: 6
- No. of episodes: 87

Production
- Producer: Park Sung-hoon
- Running time: 70–110 minutes
- Production companies: SBS Variety Unit; Chorokbaem Media

Original release
- Network: SBS
- Release: December 4, 2011 – April 2017

Related
- Good Sunday; C-pop Star

Survival Audition K-pop Star (Korean: 서바이벌 오디션 K팝 스타) is a South Korean reality competition television series where three entertainment/talent agencies in South Korea hold worldwide auditions to find the next potential K-pop stars. Preliminary auditions are held around the world in Asia, North America, South America, Europe, and Australia. The final winner debuts with the company of their choice, along with a cash prize of three hundred million won (approx. 300,000 U.S. dollars), two brand new vehicles, opportunities to become commercial models and casting in dramas, and many more benefits.

The original three judges for the series were Yang Hyun-suk, founder of YG Entertainment and former member of the popular South Korean act Seo Taiji & Boys, Park Jin-young, singer/songwriter and founder of JYP Entertainment, and Korean pop icon BoA, from SM Entertainment. SM, YG, and JYP are the three largest management companies in Korea. BoA was replaced by singer-songwriter You Hee-yeol of Antenna Music for Season 3. With the changes in judges for the third season, the three judges no longer represent the "Big 3" management companies.

K-pop Star is a part of SBS's Good Sunday lineup, along with Running Man. The show's first season aired on December 4, 2011, every Sunday evening at 6:30 pm, until April 29, 2012. The second season aired from November 18, 2012 to April 14, 2013 at 4:55 pm. Singer Yoon Do-hyun and entertainer Boom hosted the live competition for Season 1 and 2. Yoon Do-hyun narrated through the entire process in Season 1 and 2. The third season aired from November 24, 2013 to April 13, 2014, every Sunday evening at 4:40 pm KST. Jun Hyun-moo and Yoo Hye-young became the new hosts of Season 3, replacing Yoon Do-hyun and Boom. The fourth season aired from November 23, 2014 to April 12, 2015 every Sunday evening at 4:50 pm KST, with Girl's Day's Yura as live host, replacing Yoo Hye-young. The fifth season began airing on November 22, 2015.

The sixth season was announced to be the final season of K-pop Star, titled K-pop Star 6: The Last Chance. Changes to the format have been made to the final season to encourage anyone to participate in "the last chance" to become a K-pop Star. The final season aired in November 2016.

== Process ==
=== Applications + Preliminary auditions ===
Applicants can apply by phone or online during summer months, with preliminary auditions taken place in the summer months from June to September. Applicants showcase their talent to production staff who determine if they are suitable and eligible for the main audition. Many singers and idols from the three companies also help out in the preliminary audition process. Potential contestants may also audition through SBS Radio programs and bypass the preliminary auditions altogether. Preliminary auditions are held not only in South Korea, but around the world in Asia, North America, South America, Europe, and Australia as well.

=== Talent Audition (Season 1-6) ===
Contestants who passed the preliminary auditions now face the three judges in the first round of auditions. Contestants showcase their talent in singing and/or dancing, and must receive at least two of three passes from the judges or be given a wild card from one judge to proceed to round two.

=== Ranking Audition (Season 1/2/4/5/6) ===
Contestants who passed round one meet with the judges of their choice for further advice and help. Following the "Contact Audition", the contestants are organized into different groups representing their strongest talent (singing, keyboard, dancing, groups, etc.). The contestants in these groups are then ranked by the judges, with a cutoff set by the judges to decide who is eliminated.

=== Good, Fair, Poor Audition (Season 3) ===
Similar to "Ranking Audition", contestants choose a judge for further advice and help, with judges grading their contestants as "Good", "Fair", or "Poor". The contestants in these groups are then judged comparatively, deciding who is eliminated and who proceeds to the third round. An undetermined number of contestants from the "Good" group may pass, but only up to three teams can pass from the "Poor" group.

=== Team Mission (Season 3-6) ===
Contestants form teams amongst themselves to perform for the judges, showing their possibilities when collaborating with others. Groups of two teams each compete with each other, with all members of the winning team passing to the next round and at least one member of the losing team is eliminated.

=== Casting Audition (Season 1-6) ===
Remaining contestants who pass round two now once again face the judges with new performances and must be cast by one of the judges to advance to the next round. Judges cast contestants they want to see receive further training at their respective company for two weeks in an effort to improve their skills.

=== Battle Audition (Season 1-6) ===
Following the casting of contestants to the three companies, one contestant of each company are once again grouped to face off and determine who will proceed to the finals. In each group, the first placing contestant automatically receive a spot in the Top 10, with the second placing contestant facing the other second placed contestants later, and the last placing contestants are eliminated.

=== Stage Audition (Season 1-6) ===
The Top 10 now compete in the finals for the title of K-pop Star. The finals are broadcast live, in front of a live studio audience, lasting for nine weeks. The judges score each contestant, with a cumulative highest score of 300, as well as viewer voting online and through SMS, to determine the contestants score with the lowest scoring contestant eliminated. In Season 2, the first three rounds involved the Top 10 competing 1:1 on the live stage with the results determined by the judges. One contestant from each group is chosen to proceed to the next round with the contestants not chosen being saved by either SMS voting by viewers or a "Wild Card" used by the judges.

== Judges ==
The show has three judges. Originally, they represented each of the "Big 3" companies (SM, YG, and JYP). Yang Hyun-suk, who represents YG, is the founder and chief executive officer of YG Entertainment, as well as producer and former member of Seo Taiji and Boys. Park Jin-young, who represents JYP, is the founder and executive producer of JYP Entertainment, as well as a singer-songwriter. BoA, who represents SM, is a singer, songwriter, and record producer at SM Entertainment. Founder and CEO of SM Entertainment, Lee Soo-man, was originally planned to represent SM but was replaced by BoA, as PD Park Sung-hoon explains that having a female singer would produce a different synergy effect with the other two CEOs as compared to having three CEOs and producers.

For the third season, BoA decided to leave to focus on her music career. Singer-songwriter Yoo Hee-yeol replaced her as a representative of mid-sized management companies. Although SM is no longer a part of the judging panel, they will continue to partner with the program. As the "Big 3" companies are no longer reflected by the judges, the focus will shift to the judges themselves and to represent the music industry as a whole. BoA returned on the final episode of Season 3 to perform the theme song, One Dream, with past contestants of the season.

== Seasons ==
=== Season 1 ===
The first season of K-pop Star debuted on December 4, 2011 in the Good Sunday timeslot in an effort to boost ratings. As a first in Korean audition history, the "Big 3" companies coming together to find and create the next K-pop Star became a hot topic. Thousands of applicants applied to have a shot at becoming the next big thing in K-pop. A collection of talented contestants with different skills and backgrounds, as well as the interesting comments and evaluations from the judges proved to catch viewers attention, becoming a ratings success. The winner, Park Ji-min, and runner-up Lee Ha-yi, went on to become successful singers in the K-pop industry, with other contestants debuting and in the process of debuting as well.

=== Season 2 ===
The success of season one sparked the renewal of the show for season two. The second season first aired on November 18, 2012 and featured a similar format with the same judges and hosts. The ratings for this season were not as high as the previous season, but still remaining on the top of its timeslot. Contestants this season were criticized for not being as talented or interesting as the previous season, as well as large disagreements between viewers and the judges opinions. A downtrend of audition programs in South Korea are also a cause for the decrease in popularity and ratings despite the immense popularity of Superstar K4 which is held on the same year.

=== Season 3 ===
Despite a decline in popularity and ratings, the show was renewed for a third season, first aired on November 24, 2013. With the changes in judges for the third season, changes to the format occurred, including the choice of company for debut to be made immediately on the live finale.

=== Season 4 ===
The program was renewed for a fourth season premiering on November 23, 2014. Improvements to the format occurred. The same judges from Season 3 returned. Artists and representatives of each company, as well as a studio audience were added. Auditions took place from June to September 2014.

=== Season 5 ===
The program was renewed for a fifth season premiering on November 22, 2015.

=== Season 6 ===
The program was renewed for a sixth and final season premiering in November 2016. Changes to the format were made to the final season, with restrictions lifted for potential contestants to encourage anyone to participate in "the last chance" to become a K-pop Star. Existing trainees of companies as well as singers who have already debuted are allowed to participate. The winner of the final season will not choose which company to debut with, but instead will be jointly debuted and promoted by all three companies (YG, JYP, Antenna).

== Winning contestants ==
Season	Winner	Runner-up
1 (2011–2012)	Park Ji-min	Lee Ha-yi
2 (2012–2013)	Akdong Musician	Bang Ye-dam
3 (2013–2014)	Bernard Park	Sam Kim
4 (2014–2015)	Katie Kim	Jung Seung-hwan
5 (2015–2016)	Lee Soo-jung	Ahn Ye-eun
6 (2016–2017)	Park Hyun-jin & Kim Jong-seob (Boyfriend)	Kriesha Chu, Kim Hye-rin & Kim So-hee (Kwins)

== Ratings ==
Overall ratings of K-pop Star have been positive, with the first season topping over same timeslot competitor 1 Night 2 Days on April 1, 2012, and two to three times higher than previous programs in the same timeslot. The first episode of season one drew a rating of 9.3% (AGB nationwide ratings), the lowest of the season, and ended with a rating of 17.6%. The highest rating was 19.5% on episode 18 which featured the Top 6 competing, beating the top-rated 1 Night 2 Days. The second season saw a decline in ratings, although a solid start with 14.0% on the premiere episode. The highest rated episode was episode 4 at only 14.6%, and the final competition at 12.5%. The season ended with a special episode featuring contestants from both seasons competing for title of Overall Champion, which was the lowest rated episode of the entire series (7.7%). Despite intense competition in ratings, the third season managed to rank first in its timeslot for most of its run, with the highest rating of 12.9% on episode 10.

== International ==
The format of the show was sold to China in May 2013, producing a localized C-pop Star on Shandong TV.

== Awards and achievements ==
Year	Awards
2012	2012 SBS Entertainment Awards (December 30); Producer Award - Yoon Do-hyun; Outstanding Program - K-pop Star; Special Award - BoA
2013	2013 SBS Entertainment Awards (December 30); Outstanding Program: Variety Category - K-pop Star

== See also ==
- "One Dream" - theme song by BoA
