= Jellyfish Entertainment =

South Korean company

- Native name: 젤리피쉬엔터테인먼트
- Industry: Entertainment; Music
- Genre: K-pop; Dance; R&B; Ballad; Pop
- Founded: August 17, 2007; 19 years ago
- Headquarters: 33 Hakdong-ro 25-gil, Gangnam District, Seoul, South Korea
- Key people: Hwang Se-jun (CEO); Kim Byeong-seon (VP)
- Services: Artist management; Music production; Publishing; Licensing
- Owner: Hwang Se-jun (CEO) (73.53%)
- Divisions: Jellyfish Entertainment Japan
- Website: jelly-fish.co.kr

Jellyfish Entertainment (Korean: 젤리피쉬엔터테인먼트) is a South Korean entertainment company established by composer and producer Hwang Se-jun in Seoul, South Korea.

Jellyfish Entertainment is the home of artists including Jang Hye-jin, VIXX, Verivery, and Evnne, and formerly gugudan and Park Yoon-ha. The agency is also the home of actors including Kim Sun-young and Lim Seul-ong.

== History ==
=== 2007–2011: Founding and beginning ===
Jellyfish Entertainment was founded on August 17, 2007 in Seoul by composer and producer Hwang Se-jun. The first artist to sign under the company was the established ballad singer Sung Si-kyung, who released the single "Parting Once Again" (Korean: 한번 더 이별). One year later, the company signed Lisa and Park Hak-ki.

In November 2008, singer Park Hyo-shin signed to the agency and was featured on the album Hwang Project Vol.1 Welcome To The Fantastic World. The following year, Super Star K contestant Seo In-guk and Altair (Lee Ji-hoon) later joined Jellyfish Entertainment.

In December 2010, Jellyfish Entertainment artists collaborated for the Jelly Christmas holiday album project with the lead single "Christmas Time". In December 2011 Sung Si-kyung, Brian Joo, Seo In-guk, Park Hak-ki, Park Jang-hyun and Hwang Project collaborated again for Jelly Christmas with the single "Christmas for All".

Original company logo (2007-2025).

=== 2012–2015: VIXX, company acquisition and expansion into acting ===
In April 2012, Jellyfish Entertainment revealed lineup trainees of their upcoming boy group and formed the boy group on MyDOL, a competition survival show that aired on Mnet. The winners debuted as a member of VIXX on May 24, 2012. In June, Lee Seok-hoon of SG Wannabe released the digital single "The Beginning of Love" (Y.Bird from Jellyfish Island with Lee Seok Hoon) as part of Hwang Se-jun's Y.Bird from Jellyfish Island project. On September 12, Jellyfish Entertainment held their first live concert Jellyfish Live at Tokyo's Zepp Diver City in Japan, and in December, both Park Hyo-shin and Sung Si-kyung held concert performances in Seoul. Jellyfish Entertainment's artists collaborated again for the Jelly Christmas 2012 Heart Project with the single "Because It's Christmas" with the proceeds from the project donated to The Salvation Army Korea.

In February 2013, the Y.Bird from Jellyfish Island project released the digital singles "I Can't Live Because of You" by Seo In-guk featuring Verbal Jint (Y.BIRD from Jellyfish Island With Seo In Guk) in February and "Girl's Why?" by VIXX and indie duo OKDAL (Y.BIRD from Jellyfish with VIXX & OKDAL) in October. In December, 19% of Jellyfish's shares were acquired by their distributor, CJ E&M and joined the CJ E&M label system as an independent label.

In July 2015, K-pop Star 4 TOP 6 contestant Park Yoon-ha signed under the agency. following month, VIXX LR was formed as the sub-unit of VIXX, composed of rapper Ravi and vocalist Leo.

In August 2015, Jellyfish acquired actor management The Good Entertainment to expansions their business.

The Jelly Christmas 2015 single was released on December 15 with the song "Love In The Air" (Korean: 사랑난로).

=== 2016–2018: First girl group and Jelly Box ===
In the first half of 2016, Jellyfish trainees Kim Na-young, Kang Mi-na and Kim Se-jeong represented Jellyfish Entertainment in the television survival show Produce 101. Kang Mi-na and Kim Se-jeong winning the survival show debuted as part of the lineup of the year-long project girl group I.O.I, while still under Jellyfish Entertainment. It was confirmed that following their promotions as part of I.O.I, the trainees would officially debut as members of the agency's first girl group. On June 3, Jellyfish Entertainment launch their new music channel Jelly Box. Jelly Box is similar to Jellyfish Entertainment's previous project Y.Bird from Jellyfish Island and it will showcase Jellyfish Entertainment artists and producers and include collaborations with artists outside of the label. On June 28, Jellyfish debuted the nine-member girl group Gugudan. In October, Jellyfish Entertainment announced that former Dal Shabet member Jiyul, signed a contract with the agency in order to pursue her career as an actress. In November, former Jewelry member Kim Ye-won, joined Jellyfish Entertainment as an actress. On December 13, Jellyfish Entertainment released their Jelly Christmas 2016 single album with the song, "Falling" (Korean: 니가 내려와), as part of their digital music channel project Jelly Box. The Jellyfish artists participating were Seo In-guk, VIXX, Gugudan, Park Yoon-ha, Park Jung-ah, Kim Gyu-sun, Kim Ye-won and Jiyul.

In April 2017, agency trainee Yun Hee-seok represented Jellyfish Entertainment in the second season of the television survival show Produce 101. On April 10, actress Cho Hye-jung joined Jellyfish Entertainment.

In June 2017, actress Jung So-min joined Jellyfish Entertainment.

In August 2017, Jellyfish's 32% shares was acquired by CJ E&M, which previously acquired 19% of Jellyfish's shares in 2013 and effectively becoming Jellyfish Entertainment largest shareholder after having 51%. Jellyfish debuted the first sub-unit of Gugudan, Gugudan 5959, composed of Hyeyeon and Mina. On August 16, indie soloist Jang Hye-jin joined Jellyfish Entertainment.

=== 2019–present: Second boy group, Project group, continue signed new talents ===
On January 9, 2019, Jellyfish debuted their seven-member boy group Verivery. On May 3, Jellyfish sent their trainee Kim Min-kyu and Choi Jun-seong to the fourth season of the television survival show Produce X 101. The two trainee failed to joined the line-up of the winner group later revealed to be named X1, with Choi were eliminated in place 46th and Kim place 12th in final round. Choi later left the agency, while Kim continue with the agency to pursue his acting career.

On February 4, 2020, it was announced that Lim Seul-ong signed under the label. On March 6, it was revealed that as of June 6, 2019, CJ E&M had sold 40,396 shares of Jellyfish Entertainment for 1.9 billion won. The stake was acquired by Hwang Se-jun, the CEO of the company, increasing his stake from 51% to 73.53%.

In March 2020, Musical actress Kim Young-joo signed with Jellyfish. Later renewed her contract again in June 2023.

From May to July, Gugudan member Sally participated in the Chinese television survival show Produce Camp 2020. She placed sixth and made into the final group, BonBon Girls 303. On December 30, Jellyfish Entertainment announced that Gugudan would end all group activities and officially disband on December 31, 2020. On March 31, 2021, Mimi, Soyee, and Nayoung announced that they would depart from Jellyfish after their contracts have ended. On April 7, Haebin and Hyeyeon announced their departures from Jellyfish. On April 30, Hana announced her departure from Jellyfish. On May 11, Sejeong renewed her contract with Jellyfish Entertainment as a solo artist and actress.

In June 2021, Rookie actor Tak Yi-on signed with Jellyfish.

On August 6, 2021 Jellyfish Entertainment trainees Kim Da-yeon and Sakamoto Shihona competing in the television survival show Girls Planet 999. On October 22, Dayeon successfully placed 4th in the final lineup of the show's debut group, Kep1er. The group's original contract lasted 2 years and 6 months, with it set to expire in July 2024. A head of Kep1er's contract expired, Dayeon decided to renew her contracts to extend activities with Kep1er.

In September 2021, Rookie actor Ryu Won-woo signed with Jellyfish.

In January 2022, Indie artist Son Chamchi signed contract with the agency.

On December 30, 2022, Jellyfish Entertainment trainees Park Gunwook, Jang Yeojun, Park Hyunbeen and Han Yuseop were announced to be competing in the Mnet survival program, Boys Planet. On April 20, 2023, Gunwook successfully placed 5th in the final lineup of the show's resulting group, Zerobaseone (ZB1) and will be active for two years and six months. The other three trainees who failed to joined the lineup of the winner group was secretly left from Jellyfish.

On August 3, 2023, Jellyfish announced their first project group and third overall boy group, Evnne, composed of Boys Planet contestants who were eliminated from debuting in the final lineup. These contestants were Park Hanbin, Terazono Keita, Yoo Seungeon, Lee Jeonghyeon, Ji Yunseo, Mun Junghyun, and Park Jihoo.

In September 2024, Model and actor Kim Dong-gyu signed with Jellyfish.

In December 2024, it was announced that Jellyfish will signed contract with Top 5 winners of TV Chosun's University Song Festival: Lee Jae-yeop, The Tissue, Pentacles, Choi Yeo-won and Hwang Geon-woo. In April 2025, Rookie actress Lee Soo-jung signed with Jellyfish.

In June 2025, Verivery members Dongheon, Gyehyeon and Kangmin participating in the Mnet survival show Boys II Planet.

On March 23, 2026, Jellyfish announced Kim Se-jeong's departure from the company after 10 years.

In July 2026, it was revealed that Jellyfish was acquired by South Korean media company Content Technologies, becoming the label's major shareholder.

== Artists ==
=== Recording artists ===
Soloists

- Son Cham-chi
- Kangmin

Groups

- VIXX
- Verivery
- Evnne

Notable trainees

- Kim Da-yeon (Kep1er)

=== Actors/Actresses ===
- Kim Young-joo
- Tak Yi-on
- Ryu Won-woo
- Kim Dong-gyu
- Lee Soo-jung
- Jung Hye-sung (2026-present)

== Former artists ==
- Altair (Lee Ji-hoon) (2009)
- Brian Joo (2010–2012)
- Lee Seok-hoon (2012–2013)
- Park Hyo-shin (2008–2016)
- Seo In-guk (2009–2017)
- Sung Si-kyung (2007–2018)
- Jung So-min (2017–2019)
- Kim Ye-won (2016–2022)
- VIXX
  - VIXX LR (2015–2023)
    - Ravi (2012–2019)
    - Leo (2012–2024)
  - Hongbin (2012–2020)
  - N (2012–2020)
  - Hyuk (2012–2022)
  - Ken (2012–2024)
- Gong Hyun-joo (2016–2020)
- Gugudan (2016–2020)
  - Mimi (2016–2021)
  - Hana (2016–2021)
  - Haebin (2016–2021)
  - Soyee (2016–2021)
  - Sally (2016–2023)
  - Gugudan 5959 (2017–2018)
    - Hyeyeon (2016–2021)
  - Gugudan SeMiNa (2018)
    - Nayoung (2016–2021)
    - Mina (2016–2023)
    - Sejeong (2016–2026)
- Park Yoon-ha
- Kim Min-kyu (2019–2023)
- Park Ki-woong
- Lim Seul-ong
- Nam Bo-ra (2019–2024)
- Jang Hye-jin
- Kim Se-jeong (2016-2026)

Notable trainees

- Park Gun-wook

== Discography ==
=== Project albums ===
==== Jelly Christmas ====
- Jelly Christmas (2010)
- Jelly Christmas 2011
- Jelly Christmas 2012 Heart Project
- 겨울 고백 (Jelly Christmas 2013)
- Jelly Christmas 2015 – 4랑
- Jelly Christmas 2016

==== Y.Bird from Jellyfish Island ====
- Y.Bird from Jellyfish Island with Lee Seok Hoon (2012)
- Y.BIRD from Jellyfish Island With Seo In Guk (2013)
- Y.BIRD from Jellyfish Island With VIXX & OKDAL (2013)
- Y.BIRD from Jellyfish with LYn X Leo (2014)

=== Projects ===
- Jelly Box - music channel

=== Soundtracks ===
- The Legend of the Blue Sea: Original Soundtrack (2017)
- Touch Your Heart: Original Soundtrack (2019)

== Concerts ==
- Jellyfish Live (Japan, 2012)
- Y.Bird from Jellyfish Island Showcase (2013)

== Filmography ==
- 2012: MyDOL - Reality show that documented the formation and debut process of Jellyfish Entertainment's first boy band, VIXX.

== Partnership ==
Distributing labels

- (South Korea) Kakao Entertainment (Note: 2017–present on soundtrack releases, later expanded to overall distribution as of March 21, 2022. (Formerly known as Kakao M.)) (2020–present)
- (Japan) CJ Victor Entertainment (VIXX) (2012–present)
- (Japan) Nippon Crown (Seo In-guk) (2013–2017)
- (China) QQ (VIXX) (2015–present)
- Avex Taiwan (VIXX, Gugudan) (2015–present)
- Polydor Japan (VERIVERY) (2022-present)
