= Katie (singer) =

Katie Kim
- Born: Kim Seo-hyeon; December 10, 1993 (age 32); Bucheon, Gyeonggi Province, South Korea
- Genres: Pop; K-pop; R&B
- Occupation: Singer
- Instruments: Vocals; piano
- Years active: 2014–present
- Labels: AXIS; YG; AWAL

Korean name
- Hangul: 김서현
- RR: Gim Seohyeon
- MR: Kim Sŏhyŏn

Kim Seo-hyeon (Korean: 김서현; born December 10, 1993), known professionally by the mononym Katie (stylized in all caps), is a South Korean-born American singer. She finished in first place as a contestant in the South Korean singing competition SBS K-pop Star 4. Her breakthrough performance of "Where You Need To Be" reached 4 million views on South Korea's leading video-sharing site, Naver TV Cast, in the shortest amount of time in K-pop Star history. After winning the show, she decided to sign with YG Entertainment.

In May 2018, Kim joined AXIS, a new company founded by former YG creative director SINXITY. With a change of label, YG Entertainment would continue to help with the distribution of her debut album. She has since also joined the American branch of the recording label AWAL. Her debut extended play, Log, was released on May 22, 2019.

== Early life ==
Katie Kim was born Kim Seo-hyeon on December 10, 1993, in Bucheon. She immigrated to New Jersey with her family at the age of 10. Her mother would play classical music when she was a child, and she realized that she wanted to be a singer in her high school years. She studied jazz at Berklee College of Music, but had to drop out due to financial difficulties burdening her family.

== Career ==
Kim applied for K-pop Star 4 to further her career back in South Korea. She emerged as the winner for the season, and she opted to sign with YG Entertainment, and she became a trainee under the agency. After winning she performed live for the first time with hip-hop duo, Jinusean, with their latest hit, "Tell Me One More Time", which she performed at SBS Inkigayo. She spent three years under YG, where she recorded several songs and produced music videos, and YG noticed her preference for American music. She also visited the United States to participate in songwriting camps, where she wrote most of her songs for her album.

Kim's single "Remember" was re-released in 2019, with Ty Dolla Sign as a featured artist. Her manager previously managed Ty Dolla Sign, and he contacted him for the collaboration. She released her second single, "Thinkin Bout You", on May 21, with Log releasing a day later. Kim subsequently performed at the Seoul Jazz Festival on May 25.

== Artistry ==
Kim's primary influences include jazz, soul, funk, and R&B musicians such as Aaliyah, Frank Sinatra, Lalah Hathaway, Nao, D'Angelo, Erykah Badu, H.E.R., Ella Fitzgerald, Chet Baker, and Frank Ocean, most of which she listened to as a student at Berklee.

== Discography ==
=== Extended plays ===
Title	Details
Log	Released: May 22, 2019; Label: AXIS; Formats: CD, digital download
Our Time is Blue	Released: December 4, 2020; Label: AXIS; Formats: Digital download

=== Singles ===
Title	Year	Album
"Remember"	2018	Log
"Echo"	2018	Non-album single
"Future Love"	2019	Log
"Remember" (feat. Ty Dolla Sign)	2019	Log
"Thinkin Bout You"	2019	Log
"Our Time"	2020	Our Time is Blue

=== Other charted songs ===
Title	Year	Peak chart positions	Sales	Album
Title	Year	KOR	Sales	Album
"Where You Need To Be"	2015	5	KOR: 202,124	K-pop Star Season 4 Top 10
"One Candle"	2015	74	KOR: 21,472	K-pop Star Season 4 Top 6
"Only You" (너뿐이야)	2015	62	KOR: 29,608	K-pop Star Season 4 Top 2

== Awards and nominations ==
Year	Award	Category	Result
2015	K-pop Star 4	1st Place (Winner)	Won
