= K-pop Star 4 =

- Season 4
- Hosted by: Jun Hyun-moo; Yura
- Judges: Park Jin-young; Yang Hyun-suk; You Hee-yeol
- Winner: Katie Kim
- Runner-up: Jung Seung-hwan

Release
- Original network: SBS
- Original release: November 23, 2014 – April 19, 2015

Season chronology
- ← Previous; K-pop Star 3 Next → K-pop Star 5

The fourth season of the South Korean reality television competition show K-pop Star premiered on SBS on November 23, 2014, airing Sunday evenings at 4:50 pm KST as part of the Good Sunday lineup. Yang Hyun-suk, Park Jin-young, and You Hee-yeol returned as judges. The contest began receiving applications in June, with preliminary auditions taking place in Seoul and throughout South Korea, as well as the United States, Australia, Singapore, and Hong Kong until September 2014. The season ended on April 12, 2015, with Katie Kim crowned as winner and choosing to sign with YG Entertainment.

A special episode containing behind the scenes footage and interviews aired the following week. The show decided to change its rule and give the two runners-up, Jung Seung-hwan and Lee Jin-ah, the chance to choose the company they want to join as well. Both contestants chose Antenna Music and were accepted. On May 14, Lily M. revealed that she has signed an exclusive contract with JYP Entertainment.

== Process ==
- Audition applications + Preliminary auditions (June - September 2014)
  - Preliminary auditions were held from around the world in United States, Australia, Hong Kong, Singapore, and other countries.
- Round 1: Talent Audition (Airdate: November 23 – December 7, 2014)
  - Contestants who passed the preliminary auditions appear in front of the three judges for the first time. Contestants can pass with at least two "passes" from the judges, or the judge can offer to use the Wild Card.
- Round 2: Ranking Audition (Airdate: December 7–28, 2014)
  - Contestants who pass the first round are put into groups with others that are most similar to their age or singing style. The whole group can pass, fail, or a selected few can pass. Each contestant gets to have one-on-one training with Park Jin-young, Yang Hyun-suk, or You Hee-yeol.
- Round 3: Team Mission (Airdate: January 4–18, 2015)
  - Contestants form teams to compete head to head. The winning team moves on to the next round. A member of the losing team must be eliminated.
- Round 4: Casting Audition (Airdate: January 18 – February 1, 2015)
  - Contestants perform solo or in teams assigned by the judges. Each judge has six casting cards. Each spot can be occupied by a contestant or a team of contestants. Contestants not selected in the casting round are eliminated.
- Round 5: Battle Audition (Airdate: February 8–22, 2015)
  - Contestants represent the company they were cast to in a 1 to 1 to 1 battle. First place automatically gets to be in the Top 10, while 3rd place is eliminated. 2nd place takes another round by themselves. Anyone who does not get in the Top 10 teams/contestants is eliminated.
- Round 6: Stage Audition (Airdate: March 1 – April 12, 2015)
  - For the Top 8 Finals, the Top 10 competed in two groups on stage with the results determined by the judges. The top three contestants from each group were chosen to proceed to the next round.
  - The Top 8, who proceeded to the live stage, were determined by the three judges as well as a 100-member Audience Judging Panel. The last two contestants from each group became Elimination Candidates, with the Audience Judging Panel voting for their preferred act. The two acts with the most votes from the four Elimination Candidates proceeded to the Top 8, with the other two contestants eliminated.
  - For the Top 6, Top 4, Top 3 Finals, Semifinals and Finals, the judges and viewers' scores were weighted 60:40, and were combined to eliminate the contestant with the lowest score.

== Judges ==
- Yang Hyun-suk: YG Entertainment CEO, producer, singer
- Park Jin-young: JYP Entertainment Executive producer, producer, singer, songwriter
- You Hee-yeol: Antenna Music CEO, founder, singer, songwriter, composer, pianist

== Top 10 ==
- Katie Kim: Born 1993, from New Jersey, United States, Winner, signed and left YG Entertainment, under company AXIS
- Jung Seung-hwan: Born 1996, from Incheon, Runner-up, debuted under Antenna Music
- Lee Jin-ah: Born 1991, from Seoul, eliminated on April 5, 2015 (5th Live), debuted under Antenna Music
- Lily M.: Born 2002, from Australia, eliminated on March 29, 2015 (4th Live), signed under JYP Entertainment, and debuted as a member of girl group Nmixx in 2022
- Park Yoon-ha: Born 1999, eliminated on March 22, 2015 (3rd Live), signed under Jellyfish Entertainment
- Esther Kim: Born 1999, from Los Angeles, California, United States, eliminated on March 22, 2015 (3rd Live)
- Grace Shin: Born 1988, from New York, United States, eliminated on March 15, 2015 (2nd Live)
- Sparkling Girls, eliminated on March 15, 2015 (2nd Live)
  - Erin Miranda: Born 1999, from Australia
  - Hwang Yoon-joo: Born 1995, from Incheon
  - Choi Jin-sil: Born 1994, from Busan
  - Choi Joo-won: Born 1998, from Seoul
- Ji John, eliminated on March 8, 2015 (1st Live)
  - Jang Mi-ji: Born 1995, from Seoul
  - John Chu: Born 1995, from Los Angeles, United States
- Seo Ye-ahn: Born 1997, from Yeongju, eliminated on March 8, 2015 (1st Live), debuted under JTM Entertainment

== Round 6: Stage Auditions ==
- For the Top 8 Finals, the Top 10 competed in two groups on stage with the results determined by the judges. The top three contestants from each group were chosen to proceed to the next round.
  - The Top 8, who proceeded to the live stage, were determined by the three judges as well as a 100-member Audience Judging Panel. The last two contestants from each group became Elimination Candidates, with the Audience Judging Panel voting for their preferred act. The two acts with the most votes from the four Elimination Candidates proceeded to the Top 8, with the other two contestants eliminated.

Episode #	Group	Order	Name	Song - Original Artist	Rank	Result
Top 8 Finals (March 1 & 8)
15	B	1	Jung Seung-hwan	그날들 (Those Days) - Kim Kwang-seok	3rd	Top 8
15	B	2	Grace Shin	10 Minutes - Lee Hyo-ri	2nd	Top 8
15	B	3	Lily M.	아파 (It Hurts) - 2NE1	Elimination Candidate	Top 8
15	B	4	Katie Kim	니가 있어야 할 곳 (Place Where You Need to Be) - g.o.d	1st	Top 8
15	B	5	Park Yoon-ha	그대 내 품에 (Holding You in My Arms) - Yoo Jae-ha	Elimination Candidate	Top 8
16	A	1	Seo Ye-ahn	Closer - Hyolyn	Elimination Candidate	Eliminated
16	A	2	Esther Kim	Come Back Home - 2NE1	1st	Top 8
16	A	3	Ji-John	Alone - Sistar	Elimination Candidate	Eliminated
16	A	4	Lee Jin-ah	Rich in winter - Self-Written Song	2nd	Top 8
16	A	5	Sparkling Girls	When You Believe - Mariah Carey & Whitney Houston	3rd	Top 8

- The Top 8 competes 1:1 on the live stage with the results determined by the judges. One contestant from each group is chosen to proceed to the next round.
- The contestants not chosen will go through live SMS voting by viewers, where the top contestants will proceed to the next round.
- Of the remaining contestants, the judges choose one contestant to proceed to the Top 6.

Episode #	Group	Order	Name	Song - Original Artist	Judges Decision			2nd Chance	Result
Episode #	Group	Order	Name	Song - Original Artist	JYP	YG	Antenna	2nd Chance	Result
Top 6 Finals (March 15)
17	1	1	Esther Kim	Lay Me Down - Sam Smith	Esther Kim	Lily M.	Esther Kim	N/A	Top 6
17	1	2	Lily M.	Grenade - Bruno Mars	Esther Kim	Lily M.	Esther Kim	Judges	Top 6
17	2	3	Jung Seung-hwan	하늘을 달리다 (Running across the sky) - Lee Juck	Park Yoon-ha	Park Yoon-ha	Park Yoon-ha	SMS	Top 6
17	2	4	Park Yoon-ha	One Last Cry - Brian McKnight	Park Yoon-ha	Park Yoon-ha	Park Yoon-ha	N/A	Top 6
17	3	5	Grace Shin	나만 바라봐 - Taeyang	Katie Kim	Katie Kim	Katie Kim	-	Eliminated
17	3	6	Katie Kim	인디안 인형처럼 - Na-mi	Katie Kim	Katie Kim	Katie Kim	N/A	Top 6
17	4	7	Sparkling Girls	Candy Man - Brown Eyed Girls	Sparkling Girls	Lee Jin-ah	Lee Jin-ah	-	Eliminated
17	4	8	Lee Jin-ah	치어리더쏭 - Self-Written Song	Sparkling Girls	Lee Jin-ah	Lee Jin-ah	N/A	Top 6

- For the next three episodes (18-20), each week showcased a different company. As this season featured the winner choosing the company they wished to sign with on the final live stage, this gave the contestants the opportunity to experience and explore each company equally. The first week (Top 4 Finals) was YG Week, in which contestants received advice and help from YG. The second week (Top 3 Finals) was JYP Week. The third week (Semifinals) was Antenna Week.
- For the Top 4, 3 Finals, Semifinals and Finals, the judges and viewers' scores were weighted 60:40, and were combined to eliminate the contestant with the lowest score.

Episode #	Order	Name	Song - Original Artist	Judges Score			Result
Episode #	Order	Name	Song - Original Artist	JYP	YG	Antenna	Result
Top 4 Finals (March 22)
18	1	Lee Jin-ah	내 마음에 비친 내 모습 - Yoo Jae-ha	85	90	95	Top 4
18	2	Park Yoon-ha	가시나무 - 시인과 촌장 (ko)	88	87	94	Eliminated
18	3	Lily M.	Love - Keyshia Cole	95	98	91	Top 4
18	4	Katie Kim	촛불하나 (One Candle) - g.o.d	97	98	93	Top 4
18	5	Jung Seung-hwan	시랑.. 그 놈 (Love.. That guy) - Bobby Kim	88	90	93	Top 4
18	6	Esther Kim	2 Different Tears - Wonder Girls	88	90	88	Eliminated
Top 3 Finals (March 29)
19	1	Lily M.	I do - Rain	91	88	92	Eliminated
19	2	Lee Jin-ah	회상 - Sanulrim	100	90	95	Top 3
19	3	Katie Kim	하루하루 - Tashannie	94	97	94	Top 3
19	4	Jung Seung-hwan	제발 (Please) - Deulgukhwa	94	98	97	Top 3
Semifinals (April 5)
20	1	Jung Seung-hwan	기억을 걷다 (Walking on the memories) - Kim Bum-soo	97	98	97	Top 2
20	2	Katie Kim	Rehab - Amy Winehouse	91	95	96	Top 2
20	3	Lee Jin-ah	길 (Road) - g.o.d	92	90	94	Third place
Finals (April 12)
21	Round 1: Sing Each Other's Cover						
21	1	Katie Kim	사랑에 빠지고 싶다 - Kim Jo-han	98	99	98	-
21	2	Jung Seung-hwan	니가 있어야 할 곳 - g.o.d	99	95	98	-
21	Round 2: Choose Your Own Song						
21	1	Katie Kim	너뿐이야 - Park Jin-young	99	99	97	Winner
21	2	Jung Seung-hwan	만약에 말야 - Noel	96	97	98	Runner-up

== Ratings ==
In the ratings below, the highest rating for the show will in be red, and the lowest rating for the show will be in blue. (Note: Individual corner ratings do not include commercial time, which regular ratings include.)

Episode #	Original Airdate	TNmS Ratings		AGB Ratings	
Episode #	Original Airdate	Nationwide	Seoul National Capital Area	Nationwide	Seoul National Capital Area
1	November 23, 2014	10.6%	13.3%	10.9%	11.9%
2	November 30, 2014	11.7%	14.6%	12.1%	13.2%
3	December 7, 2014	10.5%	14.0%	12.1%	13.6%
4	December 14, 2014	11.1%	13.8%	12.6%	14.7%
5	December 21, 2014	10.2%	12.1%	11.5%	12.1%
6	December 28, 2014	10.7%	13.5%	12.5%	13.0%
7	January 4, 2015	11.9%	15.0%	13.9%	16.2%
8	January 11, 2015	10.0%	12.3%	11.8%	13.3%
9	January 18, 2015	10.7%	13.7%	11.6%	
10	January 25, 2015	10.1%		14.1%	
11	February 1, 2015	9.1%		11.9%	
12	February 8, 2015	9.2%		13.1%	
13	February 15, 2015	10.4%		11.8%	
14	February 22, 2015	10.8%		13.1%	
15	March 1, 2015	10.4%		12.1%	
16	March 8, 2015	10.4%		12.6%	14.0%
17	March 15, 2015	10.6%	13.1%	11.8%	12.8%
18	March 22, 2015	10.2%	13.2%	11.5%	13.2%
19	March 29, 2015	9.8%	11.6%	11.3%	13.4%
20	April 5, 2015	9.2%	10.4%	11.0%	12.5%
21	April 12, 2015			11.4%	
Special	April 19, 2015			5.5%	
