= Seo In-guk =

South Korean actor and singer (born 1987)

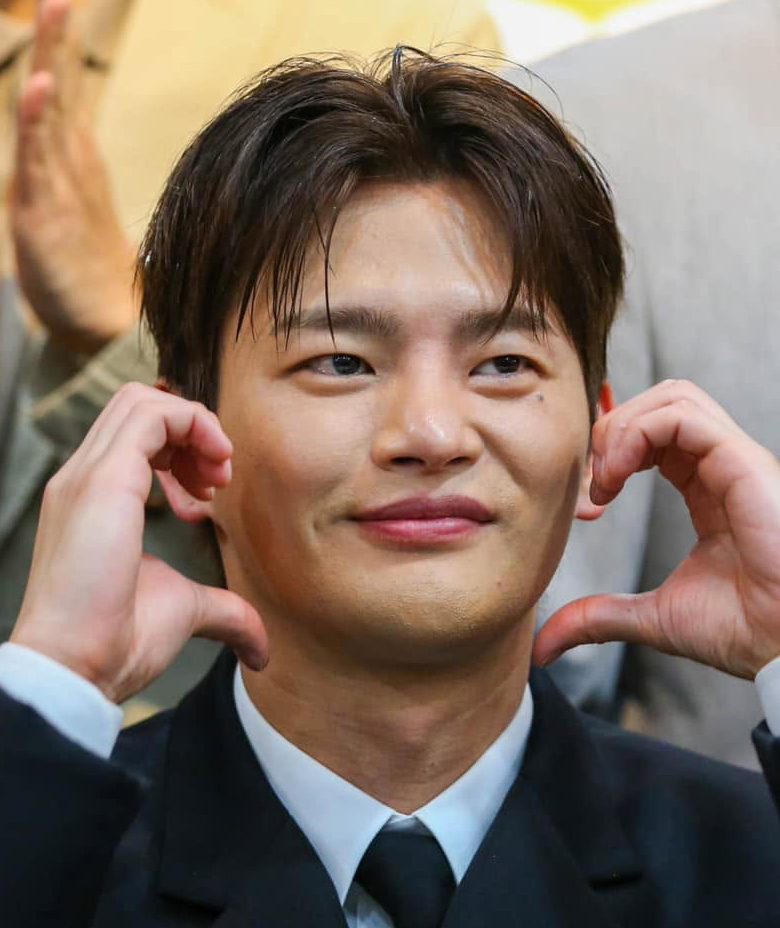
- Seo in February 2025
- Born: October 23, 1987 (age 39); Ulsan, South Korea
- Occupations: Singer; songwriter; actor
- Musical career
- Genres: K-pop; R&B; J-pop; Dance
- Instruments: Vocal; Piano; Guitar
- Years active: 2009–present
- Labels: StoryJ Company; BS Company; Jellyfish; CJ E&M; Irving; Nippon Crown; AER Music

Korean name
- Hangul: 서인국
- Hanja: 徐仁國
- RR: Seo Inguk
- MR: Sŏ In'guk

Seo In-guk (Korean: 서인국; born October 23, 1987) is a South Korean singer-songwriter and actor. He began his singing career after winning the talent reality show Superstar K in 2009, and made his acting breakthrough in Reply 1997 (2012). Since then, he has starred in television series including High School King of Savvy (2014), Hello Monster (2015), Shopping King Louie (2016), and Death's Game (2023).

== Early life and education ==
Seo was born on October 23, 1987, in Ulsan, where he lived with his parents and younger sister. He grew up in relative poverty; his mother worked as a recyclables collector and his father as a welder. Seo trained as a ssireum wrestler, learnt boxing and mixed martial arts in school and is a Hapkido 2nd dan. He decided to become a singer at the age of ten, after being inspired by the Korean rock musician Kim Jung-min and watching him perform "Sad Promise". Seo performed at family gatherings and school events, and moved to Seoul alone at the age of 20 to pursue his dream of becoming a singer despite his father's objections.

While studying Applied Music at Daebul University, Seo auditioned for various record agencies such as JYP Entertainment and DSP Media but to no success. After repeatedly being rejected and told to lose weight, he struggled with bulimia for a time. Seo later enrolled at Kyung Hee Cyber University, Department of Information and Communication. He also pursued Master's degrees in Performing Arts at Dongguk University and Practical Music (Composition) at Baekseok University.

== Career ==
=== 2009–2011: Superstar K and music releases ===
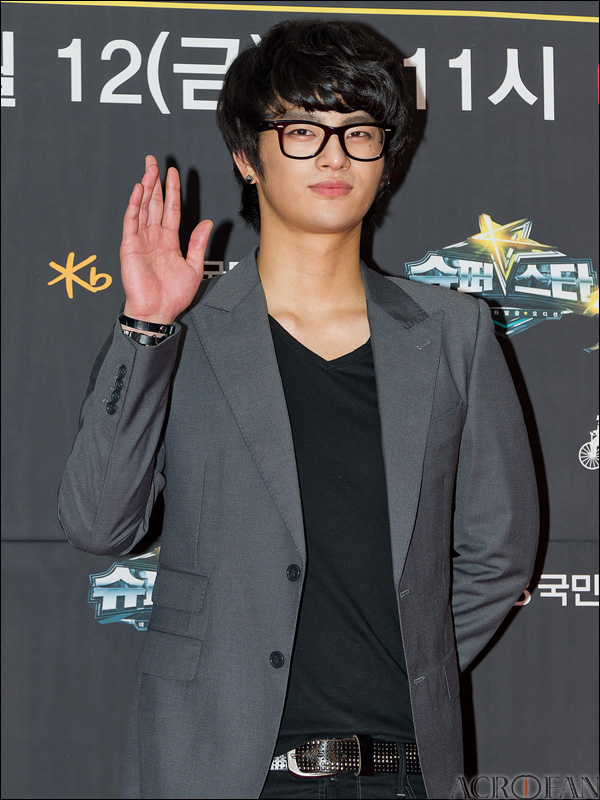
Seo in August 2011

In 2009, Seo competed in the Mnet singing competition program Superstar K, winning the show's first season. On October 27, 2009, he released his debut extended play Calling, with the same-title lead single composed by Bang Si-hyuk topping multiple music sites on its release day. Seo signed with Jellyfish Entertainment in the same year and won the Male Newcomer of the Year Award at the 2009 Cyworld Digital Music Awards.

In May 2010, Seo released his first single album Just Beginning with the lead single "I Love U". Seo made a brief foray into acting for the single's music video; he described his first acting experience as "awkward", saying, "I felt my hands and feet shrivel." The album reached number seven on the Gaon Album Chart, while the single peaked at number two on the Gaon Digital Chart. A repackage edition of the album titled My Baby U was released three months later. Having lost over 33 pounds (15 kg) since his debut through exercise and strict diet control, Seo's changes in his physical appearance brought about rumors of plastic surgery. In 2011, shifting his sound, Seo released the single "Broken" incorporating choreography into his performance, as well as summer dance track "Shake It Up" for which he penned the lyrics. Despite a successful debut, Seo reportedly received the "cold shoulder" treatment from the three major Korean public networks, as he was a cable television star.

=== 2012: Acting debut and Reply 1997 ===
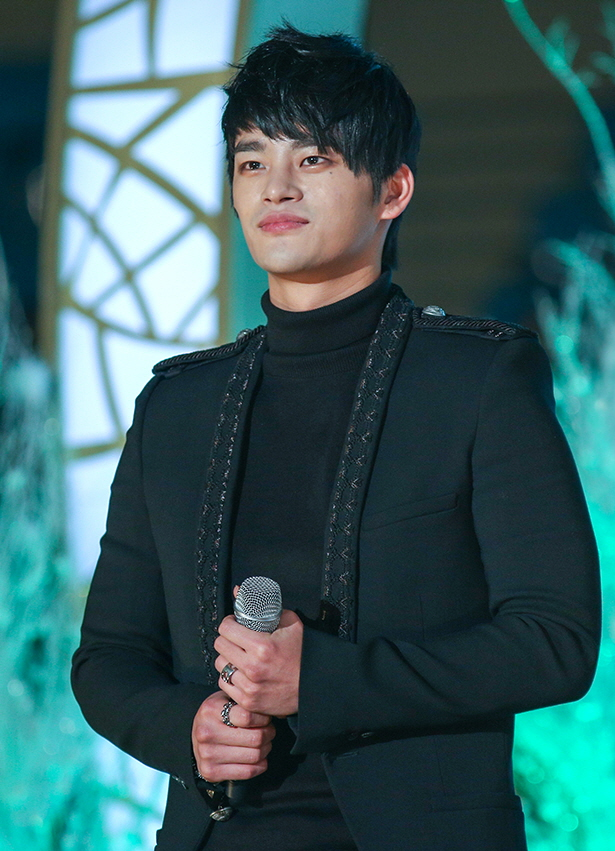
Seo at the Melon Awards in December 2012

In 2012, Seo was part of the cast of the jukebox musical Gwanghwamun Love Song and made his onscreen acting debut with a supporting role in KBS's Love Rain. According to Seo, his role in Love Rain came at a time when he was feeling anxious about the life of an entertainer, and fueled his desire for acting. He landed his first leading role later that year, in cable channel tvN's '90s nostalgic hit drama Reply 1997. Seo's portrayal of a teenage boy in unrequited love with his childhood best friend won praise from both audiences and critics. Yonhap News praised, "It's hard to believe he's a rookie, from acting in his eyes, to handling lines and expressing emotions". As part of the drama's soundtrack, Seo recorded two duets with co-star Jung Eun-ji. The first duet "All For You", a remake of the song by Cool, topped weekly and monthly music charts and became one of the best-selling singles of the year on the Gaon Digital Chart. The single also won the Best OST award at the Melon Music Awards and Mnet Asian Music Awards that year. Seo appeared in MBC's weekend drama The Sons (also known as Rascal Sons) in the same year, and also signed with Japanese agency Irving Entertainment.

=== 2013–2015: Japanese debut, variety shows and return to acting ===
Seo joined the newly launched reality/variety show I Live Alone from January to June 2013. He returned to the music scene in April 2013 with the single With Laughter or with Tears, the first soulful ballad from his discography. Several weeks later, the song was followed by his Japanese debut with the release of the single Fly Away.

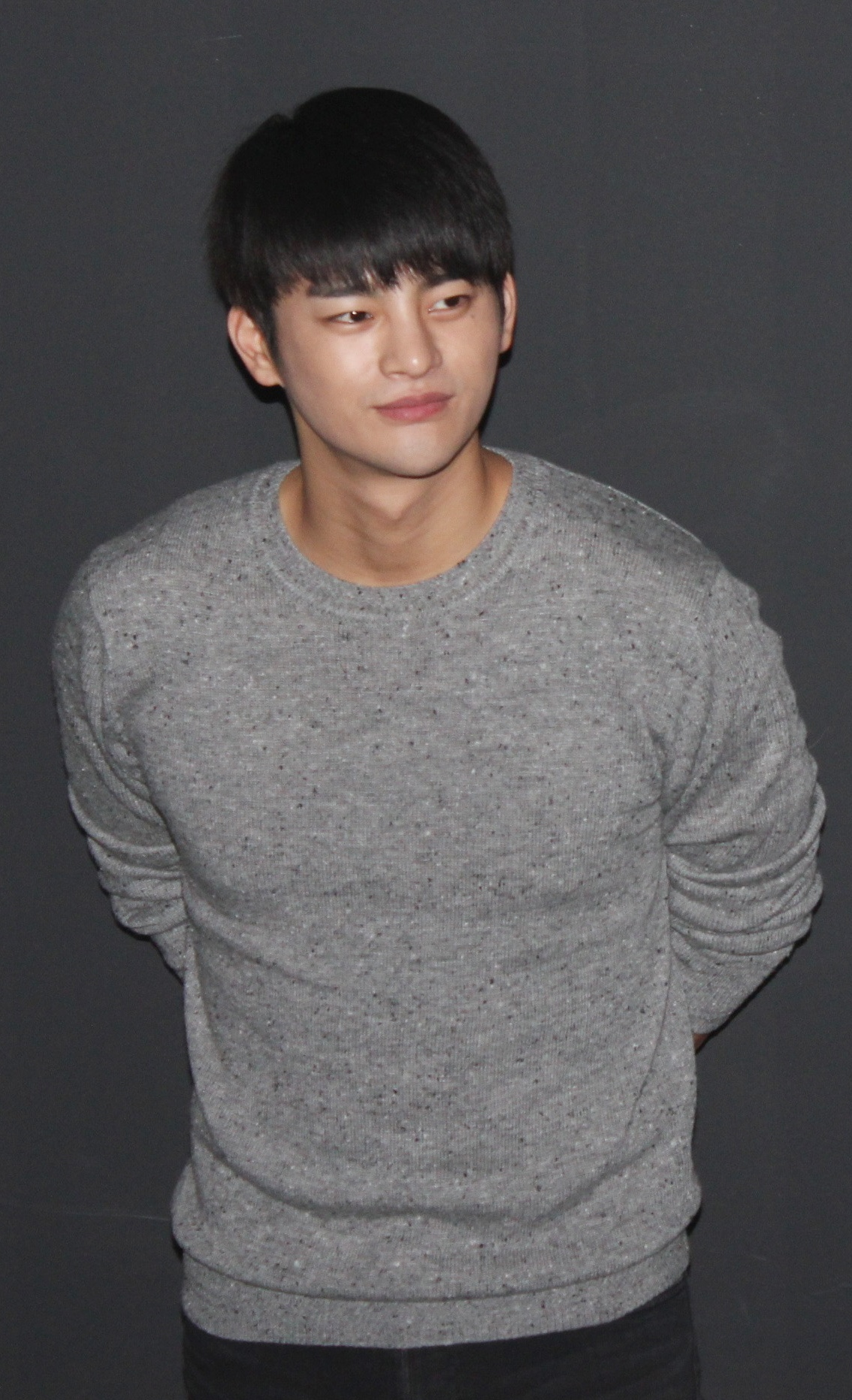
Seo in Busan, South Korea in November 2013

In June 2013, he was cast in Master's Sun, a drama series written by the Hong sisters, playing a former soldier who served in the Zaytun Division who becomes the head of security for a shopping mall company. In October 2013, he starred in his first big-screen leading role in No Breathing, a coming-of-age film about two swimming rivals, alongside Lee Jong-suk and Kwon Yuri. He then played a dual role in Another Parting, a five-episode miniseries about a man and a woman who meet in the final moment of their lives and spend one special day together.

In 2014, Seo released his first Japanese album titled Everlasting, which comprises his previously released singles "Fly Away" and "We Can Dance Tonight". The album also features a new track titled "Everlasting Love" with a total of 12 tracks. The album debuted at number nine on the Oricon Daily Chart. Seo later won the Best 3 New Artists (Asia) award at the Japan Gold Disc Awards.

Following the cancellation of action noir film Wild Dog which would have been Seo's second big-screen appearance, Seo headlined cable romantic comedy series High School King of Savvy in which he played a high school student and star hockey player who leads a double life when he's forced to take on his elder brother's job as an executive at an IT company. Later that year, Seo starred in his first period drama The King's Face, playing illegitimate crown prince Gwanghae, who becomes his father King Seonjo's rival in politics and love. In 2015, Seo joined the cast of SBS variety show Law of the Jungle from March to May, for the Indochina season. He was then cast as a genius profiler in the police procedural/romance series Hello Monster which premiered in June 2015 on KBS2.

=== 2016–2020: Career fluctuations ===
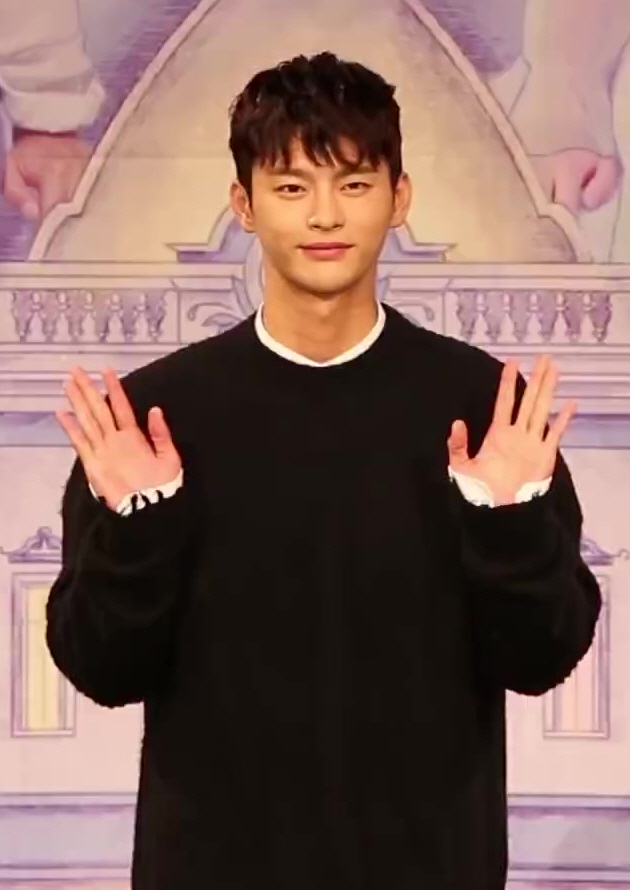
Seo in September 2016

In 2016 Seo joined Law of the Jungle for the second time for the show's Mongolia season. He also starred in OCN's workplace drama Squad 38, playing a professional swindler. Seo called the role a turning point in his acting career, and he received favourable press reviews for his ease of transformation into multiple character personas. The drama became the highest rated drama for OCN, and Seo won a special award for his role at the 11th Asian TV Drama Conference. He then took on the leading role in MBC's romantic comedy Shopping King Louie, playing the role of an amnesic chaebol heir with childlike innocence. For his performance, Seo was awarded the Excellence Award at the 2016 MBC Drama Awards. On August 4, 2017, it was confirmed that Seo's contract with Jellyfish Entertainment had expired and that he would not be renewing his contract. On August 7, it was announced Seo had signed with BS Company.

In 2018, Seo starred in mystery melodrama The Smile Has Left Your Eyes, a remake of the 2002 Japanese television series Sora Kara Furu Ichioku no Hoshi. The drama reunited Seo with director Yoo Je-won, whom he had previously worked with in High School King of Savvy. Seo had initially contemplated taking up the role but decided to join the project following numerous discussions with director Yoo. Despite the drama's lackluster ratings, Seo's performance garnered positive press reviews. The Straits Times wrote, "It is a role that could easily slip into creepiness or smugness but Seo manages to pull off a delicate balancing act." Seo was set to star in film Hip Daddy but stepped down from the project in 2020 after production was put on hold.

In May 2021, Seo made his small-screen return with fantasy romance drama Doom at Your Service as the personification of destruction. In the same month, he also returned to the big screen after eight years in Yoo Ha's comedy-crime film Pipeline as a drilling expert involved in an oil heist. Director Yoo said about Seo's casting, "I was fascinated the first time I saw him. [...] His face showed so much different potential."

=== 2021–present: Return to music and Death's Game ===
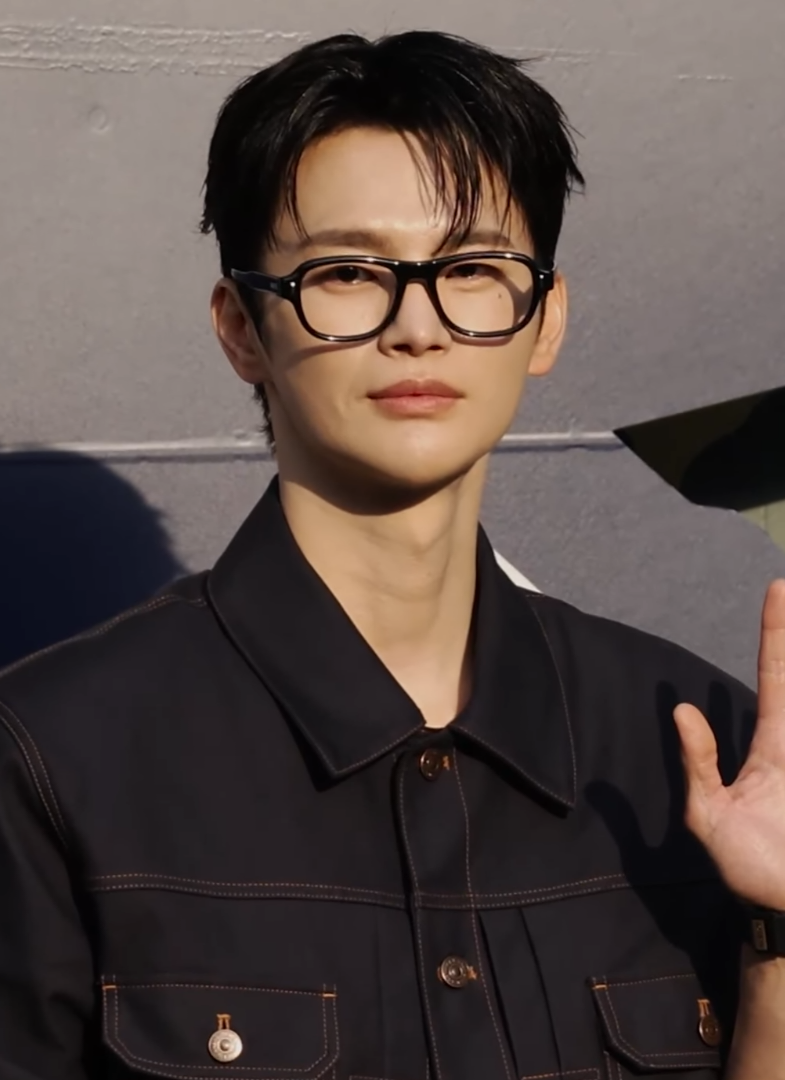
Seo in May 2026

In December 2021, Seo signed a singer contract with AER Music. On June 14, 2022, Seo released his new single album Love&Love and its lead single "My Love", featuring Ravi, his first release after five years. A teaser for the music video was released on June 9, 2022, on YouTube. The same year, he played a profiler-turned-shaman in KBS2 drama Café Minamdang, alongside Oh Yeon-seo. On June 14, it was announced that Seo 'Heart & Love' fan meeting will be held at Yes24 Live Hall on July 30. On December 6, 2022, Seo will release the single "Fallen", the first single released in six months. Seo then starred in Kim Hong-sun's action thriller film Project Wolf Hunting as a criminal with Jang Dong-yoon, alongside Choi Gwi-hwa and Sung Dong-il. On February 8, 2023, Seo was confirmed to star in the TVING original series Death's Game.

In 2026, he starred in Netflix's romantic comedy series Boyfriend on Demand opposite Jisoo. In June, he starred in tvN's Kakao Webtoon adaption series, See You at Work Tomorrow!, for which he also performed the OST, "The One Who Fills Me". On September 29, he released his Japanese EP Trace, featuring the title track "Tipsy".

== Personal life ==
=== Military service exemption ===
In February 2017, it was announced that Seo received his official military enlistment date, set to take place on March 28. He had previously delayed his enlistment twice, starting in March 2015, citing his health as a reason. Neither the media nor his management company stated whether he had received treatment, but he passed a physical to enlist. It was reported he would quietly enter the mandatory two-year military service period without media coverage. Seo opted instead to release a music video for his self-composed song, "Better Together", for his fans. The video was released on YouTube on March 26, 2017. However, due to a fractured ankle, Seo was excused from conscription four days after entering and scheduled for a medical re-examination. His agency released the results, revealing Seo was diagnosed with osteochondritis dissecans, a bone and cartilage condition. He was given a Grade 5 health rating and consequently exempted.

== Filmography ==
Key
†	Denotes films that have not yet been released

=== Film ===
Year	Title	Role	Ref.
2013	No Breathing	Jo Won-il	
2016	I Love That Crazy Little Thing	Yang Ming Zhe (Cameo)	
2021	Pipeline	Pin Dol-yi	
2022	Project Wolf Hunting	Jong-doo	
2023	The Boys	Lee Jae-seok	
2025	Boy	Mad Hatter	

=== Television series ===
Key
†	Denotes television productions that have not yet been released

Year	Title	Role	Notes	Ref.
2012	Love Rain	Kim Chang-mo (1970s) / Kim Jeon-seol (2012)		
2012	Reply 1997	Yoon Yoon-jae		
2012	The Sons	Yoo Seung-gi		
2013	Master's Sun	Kang Woo		
2013	Reply 1994	Yoon Yoon-jae	Cameo, episodes 16-17, 21	
2014	High School King of Savvy	Lee Min-seok / Lee Hyung-seok		
2014	The King's Face	Prince Gwanghae		
2015	Hello Monster	Lee Hyun / David Lee		
2015	Oh My Ghost	Edward Seo	Cameo, episode 16	
2015	She Was Pretty	Himself	Cameo, episode 9	
2016	Squad 38	Yang Jeong-do		
2016	Shopping King Louie	Louis / Kang Ji-sung		
2018	The Smile Has Left Your Eyes	Kim Moo-young		
2019	Abyss	Alien "Grim Reaper"	Cameo, episode 1	
2021	Navillera	Hwang Hee	Cameo, episode 9	
2021	Doom at Your Service	Myul Mang / Kim Sa-ram		
2022	Soundtrack 1	Jay Jun	Cameo	
2022	Café Minamdang	Nam Han-joon		
2023–2024	Death's Game	Choi Yi-jae		
2025	Twelve	Won-seung		
2026	Boyfriend on Demand	Park Kyeong-nam		
2026	See You at Work Tomorrow!	Kang Si-woo		
TBA	The Office Worker Who Sees Destiny †	Choi Young-hoon		

=== Web series ===
Year	Title	Role	Notes	Ref.
2014	Another Parting	Ahn Young-mo		

=== Television shows ===
Year	Title	Role	Notes	Ref.
2009	Superstar K1	Winner		
2013	I'm Seo In-guk	Himself	Original documentary, 10 episodes	
2013	I Live Alone	Cast member	Episodes 1–14, 16, 26	
2013	Mamma Mia	Host	Episode 32 (Special MC)	
2013	KBS Entertainment Awards	Host	with Shin Dong-Yup and Goo Hara	
2014	KBS Drama Awards	Host	with Kim Sang-kyung and Park Min-young	
2015	Law of the Jungle in Indochina	Cast member	Episodes 154–158	
2015	K-Pop World Festival in Changwon	Host	with Choa and Lee Ji-Yeon	
2015	Mari and Me	Cast member		
2016	Law of the Jungle in Mongolia	Cast member	Episodes 229–233	
2024	Jungle Bob	Cast member	Episodes 1-4	

=== Web shows ===
Year	Title	Role	Notes	Ref.
2025–2026	Better Late Than Single	Host/Cupid	Season 1–2	

=== Music video appearances ===
Year	Title	Artist
2012	"Please Don't..." (이러지마 제발)	K.Will
2012	"I Just Walked" (그냥 걸었어)	Jo Moon Geun
2013	"Pick Up the Phone" (다시는)	Phone
2014	"Another Parting" (어떤 안녕)	Melody Day
2024	"No Sad Song For My Broken Heart" (내게 어울릴 이별 노래가 없어)	K.Will

== Musical theatre ==
Year	Title	Role	Theater	Date	Ref.
2012	Gwanghwamun Love Song (광화문 연가)	Hyun-woo	LG Art Centre	February 7 to March 11	
2023–2024	Monte Cristo (몬테크리스토)	Edmond Dantes	Chungmu Art Centre Grand Theatre	November 21 to February 25	

== Concerts ==
Date	Title	Venue	Ref.
December 26, 2010	2010 Sentimental City _{(with Lena Park)}	Olympic Gymnastics Arena	
December 28, 2013	Supri-In Guk!	Ewha Womans University Auditorium	
December 29, 2013	Supri-In Guk!	Ewha Womans University Auditorium	
December 31, 2016	MINT CHOCOLATE	Yes24 Live Hall	
December 8, 2018	[New Year] Snow: Frame - Our Season to Be Together	Yes24 Live Hall	
December 9, 2018	[New Year] Snow: Frame - Our Season to Be Together	Yes24 Live Hall	
December 28, 2019	S#33 / TAKE10	Donghae Culture and Arts Center	

== Ambassadorship ==
Seo in Boracay, Philippines as Korean ambassador for the country's Department of Tourism

Year	Organization/Event	Notes	Ref.
2012–2014	2014 International Telecommunication Union Plenipotentiary Conference	with Jung Eun-ji	
2013–2015	Ulsan Metropolitan Police Agency: Eradicating the 4 Societal Evils	Ambassador, Honorary police officer	
2014	2014 Korea Brand & Hallyu Product Expo (KBEE)	with VIXX	
2015	Baekseok University Graduate School		
2021	Seoul Tourism Promotion: Seoul Six Senses		
2025	Department of Tourism (Philippines)	Philippine Tourism Ambassador for Korea	

== Awards and nominations ==
Name of the award ceremony, year presented, category, nominee of the award, and the result of the nomination
Award ceremony	Year	Category	Nominee / Work	Result	Ref.
APAN Star Awards	2012	Rising Star Award	Reply 1997	Won	
APAN Star Awards	2012	Best Couple Award	Seo In-guk (with Jung Eun-ji); Reply 1997	Won	
APAN Star Awards	2012	Best OST	"All for You" with Jung Eun-ji	Won	
Asia Artist Awards	2022	Best Artist Award – Actor	Seo In-guk	Won	
Asia Star Entertainer Awards	2026	Fan Choice Couple	Seo In-guk (with Jisoo); Boyfriend on Demand	Nominated	
Asian TV Drama Conference	2016	Special Award, Actor	Squad 38, Shopping King Louie	Won	
Baeksang Arts Awards	2013	Best New Actor – Television	Reply 1997	Nominated	
Baeksang Arts Awards	2016	Most Popular Actor (TV)	Hello Monster	Nominated	
Baeksang Arts Awards	2017	Most Popular Actor (TV)	Shopping King Louie	Nominated	
Baeksang Arts Awards	2023	Best New Actor – Film	Project Wolf Hunting	Nominated	
Blue Dragon Film Awards	2022	Best New Actor	Project Wolf Hunting	Nominated	
Cyworld Digital Music Awards	2009	Male Newcomer of the Year	"Calling"	Won	
Gaon Chart K-Pop Awards	2013	Song of the Year (September)	"All for You" with Jung Eun-ji	Won	
Gaon Chart K-Pop Awards	2014	Song of the Year (December)	"Loved You" with Zia	Won	
Japan Gold Disc Awards	2014	Best 3 New Artists (Asia)	Everlasting	Won	
KBS Drama Awards	2012	Best New Actor	Love Rain	Nominated	
KBS Drama Awards	2014	Excellence Award, Actor in a Mid-length Drama	The King's Face	Nominated	
KBS Drama Awards	2014	Best New Actor	The King's Face	Won	
KBS Drama Awards	2014	Netizen Award, Actor	The King's Face	Nominated	
KBS Drama Awards	2014	Best Couple Award	Seo In-guk (with Jo Yoon-hee); The King's Face	Nominated	
KBS Drama Awards	2015	Excellence Award, Actor in a Miniseries	Hello Monster	Nominated	
KBS Drama Awards	2015	Netizen Award, Actor	Hello Monster	Nominated	
KBS Drama Awards	2015	Best Couple Award	Seo In-guk (with Jang Na-ra); Hello Monster	Nominated	
KBS Drama Awards	2022	Top Excellence Award, Actor	Café Minamdang	Nominated	
KBS Drama Awards	2022	Excellence Award, Actor in a Miniseries	Café Minamdang	Nominated	
KBS Drama Awards	2022	Best Couple Award	Seo In-guk (with Oh Yeon-seo); Café Minamdang	Won	
Korea Drama Awards	2012	Best New Actor	Love Rain	Won	
Korea Drama Awards	2012	Best Couple Award	Seo In-guk (with Jung Eun-ji); Reply 1997	Won	
Korea Drama Awards	2014	Excellence Award, Actor	High School King of Savvy	Nominated	
Korea Drama Awards	2015	Excellence Award, Actor	Hello Monster	Nominated	
MBC Drama Awards	2012	Best New Actor	The Sons	Nominated	
MBC Drama Awards	2016	Grand Prize (Daesang)	Shopping King Louie	Nominated	
MBC Drama Awards	2016	Excellence Award, Actor in a Miniseries	Shopping King Louie	Won	
MBC Drama Awards	2016	Best Couple Award	Seo In-guk (with Nam Ji-hyun); Shopping King Louie	Nominated	
Melon Music Awards	2012	Best OST	"All for You" with Jung Eun-ji	Won	
Mnet Asian Music Awards	2010	Best New Male Artist	"I Love U"	Nominated	
Mnet Asian Music Awards	2012	Best OST	"All for You" with Jung Eun-ji	Won	
Mnet Asian Music Awards	2014	Best Collaboration	"Loved You" with Zia	Nominated	
SBS Drama Awards	2013	New Star Award	Master's Sun	Won	
Soompi Awards	2019	Actor of the Year	The Smile Has Left Your Eyes	Nominated	
Soompi Awards	2019	Best Couple Award	Seo In-guk (with Jung So-min); The Smile Has Left Your Eyes	Nominated	
Style Icon Awards	2012	Top 10 Style Icons	Seo In-guk	Won	
Style Icon Awards	2014	Top 10 Style Icons	Seo In-guk	Nominated	
tvN10 Awards	2016	Made in tvN Actor (Drama)	Reply 1997	Won	
tvN10 Awards	2016	Best Kiss	Seo In-guk (with Jung Eun-ji); Reply 1997	Won	
