= I Live Alone (TV program) =

South Korean entertainment program

- Promotional poster
- Also known as: Home Alone
- Hangul: 나 혼자 산다
- RR: Na honja sanda
- MR: Na honja sanda
- Genre: Reality television Talk show
- Directed by: Heo Hang
- Starring: see 'Current members'
- Opening theme: Handsome by The Vaccines
- Country of origin: South Korea
- Original language: Korean
- No. of seasons: 1
- No. of episodes: 629

Production
- Production location: South Korea
- Camera setup: Multi-camera
- Running time: 100 Minutes
- Production company: MBC

Original release
- Network: MBC TV, MBC Drama, MBC every1
- Release: March 22, 2013 – present

Related
- When a Man Lives Alone (남자가 혼자 살 때)

I Live Alone (Korean: 나 혼자 산다; RR: Na honja sanda), also known as Home Alone, is a South Korean entertainment program distributed and syndicated by MBC every Friday at 23:00 (KST).

== Content ==
I Live Alone is recognized as one of the Real-Variety shows in Korean television. The program is unscripted using documentary techniques with variety show elements, which follows the format of other reality television programs such as Infinite Challenge, which airs on the same network. Every Friday night, this program plays footage from selected Rainbow Club members' everyday lives, both in and out of their homes. As proclaimed on its homepage, there are about 5 million singles in South Korea and about one-third of South Korean entertainers are not in a relationship. This program shows viewers how single celebrities live, and has attained great popularity due to the relatability of the single lifestyles of various celebrities, which are shown without significant filtering. Since its inception, each host of the program has gathered other celebrity guests to form a club called the Rainbow Club (무지개; mujigae; 'Rainbow').

== Philanthropy ==
On December 23, 2022, I Live Alone donated all proceeds from calendar sales through the Beautiful Foundation.

== Current members ==
Member	Episodes #
Kian84	145 – present
Jun Hyun-moo	26 – 285, 400 – present
Lee Joo-seung	427 – present
Code Kunst	429 – present
Goo Sung-hwan	427 - present
Kim Dae-ho	491 - present
Park Ji-hyeon	536 - present
Ahn Jae-hyun	541 - present
Ok Ja-yeon	583 - present
Joy	591 - present
Im Woo-il	594 - present
Ko Kang-yong	600 - present

== Former members ==
Member	Episode #
Seo In-guk	1 – 16
Lee Sung-jae	1 – 37
Defconn	1 – 62
Yang Yo-seob	28 – 45
Yook Joong-wan	41 – 149
Kangnam	73 – 137
Han Hye-jin	168 – 320
Lee Si-eon	174, 177 – 377
Henry Lau	190, 192 – 397
Sung Hoon	212, 214 – 431
Hwasa	247 – 458
Lee Jang-woo	323 – 625
Park Na-rae	174 – 625
Key	391 – 626

== Guests (with segments) ==
Guest	Episodes #
Noh Hong-chul	1, 3-4, 9, 10, 12, 13-14, 15, 20, 22, 23, 24-25, 30, 37, 43, 47, 50, 54, 58-60, 74
Kim Tae-won	2, 3-4, 5-6, 7, 8, 10, 15, 16, 17, 19, 20, 21, 24-25
Lee Sung-jae	2, 3-4, 5-6, 7, 8, 9, 10, 11, 12, 16, 17, 19, 21, 23, 24-25, 26, 28, 29, 31, 36, 37
Defconn	2, 3-4, 5-6, 7, 8, 9, 10, 16, 17, 19, 20, 21, 23, 24-25, 26, 27, 30, 32, 34, 36, 40, 42, 44, 45, 49, 51, 52, 56, 62
Seo In-guk	2, 3-4, 5-6, 7, 9, 10, 11, 14
Kang Shinju	13-14
Kim Kwang-min	13-14
Lee Kyung-kyu	14
Kangta (H.O.T.)	15, 16, 17, 20, 22, 24-25
Kim Je-dong	18
Kim Yong-gun	18, 22, 23, 26, 27, 29, 30, 35, 39, 40, 44, 46, 49, 53, 55, 58, 61, 64, 72, 80, 81, 83, 89, 93, 95, 101, 106, 109, 112-114, 117, 120, 125, 128, 135, 139, 146, 151, 155, 157, 163, 175
Fabien	38, 42, 44, 46, 47, 48, 51, 52, 54, 57, 61, 62, 63, 64, 65, 68-69, 71-72, 74, 78, 84, 85, 89, 93, 447
Hong Seok-cheon	34
Yo-seob (Highlight)	28, 29, 30, 32, 35, 39, 41, 42, 45
Jang Yoon-ju	26
Kim Min-jun	27, 33, 34, 35, 37, 39, 43, 45, 47, 49
Kim Do Kyun	31
Jung Hyung-don	32
Yook Joong-wan	41, 46, 47, 49, 50, 51, 52, 53, 54, 56, 57, 58, 60, 63, 65, 66, 67, 68, 71, 72, 74, 76, 80, 81, 82, 83, 85, 86, 87, 90, 93, 94, 98, 100, 101, 105-106, 108, 110, 114, 115, 116, 118, 119, 122, 123, 125, 127, 131, 138, 139, 141, 142, 145, 147, 148, 149
Hong Jinho	43
Lee Jung	48
Ha Seok-jin	61, 70, 76, 365, 520
Soyou	55
Shim Hyung-tak	64, 70
Kwak Dong-yeon	66, 70, 80
Yoon Da-hoon	67
Lee Tae-gon	69, 74, 75, 76, 77, 79, 81, 82, 85, 86, 87, 90, 92, 94, 95, 96, 98, 99, 100, 102, 103, 105-106, 109, 111
Hyolyn	89
Lee Kyu-han	92
Amber	95
Lee Eun-gyeol	97
Kim Dong-wan	99, 101, 103, 104, 105, 107, 109, 112, 114, 116, 119, 121, 122, 124, 128, 129-131, 133, 138, 139, 142, 144, 147, 149, 150, 156, 161
Hwang Seok-jeong	103, 106, 109, 110, 115, 116, 119, 121, 123, 124, 128, 130, 136
Cheetah	107–108
Ye Jung-hwa	107–108
Maeng Ki-yong	107–108
Kang Min-hyuk (CNBLUE)	111, 114, 117, 118, 120, 122, 123, 124, 127, 129, 132, 134
Kim Young-chul	113, 117, 118, 120, 123, 124, 128, 132, 133-134, 135, 136, 138, 141, 142, 145, 147, 153, 154, 156, 158, 162, 168, 169
Dok2	121
Lee Guk-joo	126-127, 134, 135, 137, 138, 139, 141, 142, 143, 147, 149, 150, 152, 153, 154, 155, 157, 158, 162, 165, 169, 170, 171, 172, 173, 176, 178, 183
Hwang Chi-yeul	126-127, 131, 134, 136, 137, 139, 142, 144, 146, 148, 153, 159, 161, 166, 168
Hwang Jae Geun	129
Ahn Se-ha	133
Kangnam	73, 75, 77, 78-79, 81, 82, 83-84, 85, 86, 87, 88, 89, 91, 93, 94, 96, 97, 98, 99, 100, 102, 104, 105, 109, 110, 111, 112-114, 117, 118, 120, 123, 125, 131, 132, 135, 137
Jun Hyun-moo	25, 28, 29, 30, 31, 32, 33, 34, 40, 41, 44, 45, 47, 48, 52, 53, 54, 55, 57, 63, 65, 66, 68, 70, 71, 72, 76, 77, 78, 79, 82, 88, 90, 91, 93, 94, 96, 97, 101, 102, 104, 106, 109, 112, 116, 119, 123, 125, 130, 132, 135, 138, 141, 142, 144, 150, 154, 155, 157, 161, 165, 169, 171, 172, 173, 178, 182, 186-187, 195, 198, 199, 206, 211, 214–216, 224-227, 238-240, 243, 249, 255-256, 258, 261, 264, 334, 414, 415, 421–422, 424, 428, 437, 444–445, 448, 449–450, 454, 462–463, 465–466, 473, 475–476, 477, 481, 486–487, 489–490, 494–496, 497, 500-501, 505, 511, 515, 524, 525-526, 533, 535-536, 543-544, 547, 552-553, 555, 571
Ray Yang	140
Dong Hyun Kim	140
Kian84	145, 163, 167, 171, 173, 176, 178, 180, 184, 194, 197, 203, 207, 209, 214-215, 218-221, 225-227, 230, 233, 238-240, 242-243, 246-248, 252-256, 260-261, 264, 268, 285-286, 299, 300–302, 309-311, 313, 325-326, 335, 342, 350, 355–356, 357, 367, 369, 375–377, 378–379, 383, 386–387, 392, 396, 404, 408, 409, 417–418, 421–424, 429, 435, 438–439, 441–442, 444–445, 448, 451, 457–458, 470–471, 473, 477, 478, 479–480, 486, 488, 489–490, 494–496, 500, 506, 512, 517-518, 524, 527, 530-531, 535-536, 540, 550, 556, 572
Han Chae-ah	146, 147, 150, 153, 154, 155, 157, 158, 163, 165, 171
Brave Brothers	25, 148, 391
Crush	151, 159, 463, 470
Eric Nam	151
Oh Chang-seok	152
Uhm Hyun-kyung	152
Kim Ban-jang	156, 159, 161, 162, 163, 165, 167, 171
Jung Joon-young	160
Jisook (Rainbow)	160
Sunwoo Sun	164
Ji Sang-ryeol	164
Jang Woo-hyuk (H.O.T.)	166, 167, 172, 173, 177
Han Hye-jin	168, 171, 172, 175, 179, 180, 185, 190, 192, 194, 195, 199, 206, 208, 209, 214-215, 222–223, 225–227, 238–241, 245, 247–251, 255–257, 259, 261–262, 268, 272–276, 282–283, 287, 314, 319–320, 358, 369
C Jamm	170, 173, 175
Heize	170
Sleepy	172, 179, 181
Lee Si-eon	174, 177, 178, 184, 188, 193, 197, 202, 203, 205, 207, 208, 210, 213–215, 220-221, 223–227, 231, 233, 238–243, 246, 249–251, 255-256, 258, 261, 263, 269, 270, 272, 273, 275, 278, 285, 286, 289, 290, 292–293, 298, 300–301, 304, 309–311, 321, 325–327, 329, 338, 363, 364, 367, 369, 374, 376-377
Park Na-rae	174, 178, 181, 183, 186, 190, 191-192, 193, 195, 196, 198, 199, 200–201, 202, 208, 209, 212, 214-215, 220–221, 225–227, 230, 232, 238–240, 244, 249–250, 251, 253, 255–256, 259, 261, 262, 265, 270, 273, 275, 280–281, 288, 294, 300–301, 302, 305–306, 308, 312, 314–315, 319–320, 327, 331, 337–338, 347, 359, 361, 363, 369, 376–377, 378–379, 384, 389, 394, 404, 408, 419, 421–422, 430–431, 439–440, 447, 452–453, 455–456, 461, 465–466, 472, 473, 475–476, 477, 482, 486–487, 491–492, 494–496, 500-501, 503, 508, 514, 520, 525-526, 533, 538, 543-544, 548, 552-553
Kim Yeon-koung	175-176, 188, 205, 242–244, 300, 301, 356, 360, 412–413, 499
Lee Sun-bin	177
Choi Deok-moon	179
Lee So-ra	180, 189
Park Jin-joo	181
Jo Woo Jong	182
Lena Park	183
Lee Soo-kyung	184
Kim Joon-ho	185
Daniel Henney	186-187, 238–240
Yoon Hyun-min	189, 193, 196, 198, 207, 213-215
Henry Lau	190, 192, 196, 203, 206, 207, 214, 215, 217, 219, 222, 224–228, 231, 233, 242–244, 253–254, 257, 266–267, 271–273, 275–277, 286, 290, 292–293, 297, 299, 300–301, 304–305, 310, 311, 319–320, 322, 325–327, 334, 360–362, 373, 376–377, 380, 386–387, 392-393
Lee Gi-kwang (Highlight)	191
Zion.T	193
Cho Jun-ho	194
Kwon Hyuk-soo	195, 204
Kim Ji-soo	197
Sol Bi	199
Junho (2PM)	202, 397, 419
Kim Seul-gi	204
Kim Choong Jae	220–221, 264–265, 272–273, 283–284, 295–296, 300–301, 309, 317, 369, 396
Kim Sa-rang	210, 211, 222
Sung Hoon	212, 214-215, 217, 229, 248, 263, 267, 271-272, 276, 280, 282, 285, 287, 288, 292–293, 295, 299–303, 307–308, 310–311, 313, 325–328, 332, 341–343, 347–348, 355–356, 361–362, 367, 369, 376–377, 382, 389, 399, 406, 421–422, 424
Han Hye-yeon	216, 291, 300–301, 308, 317–318, 325–327, 352
Taeyang (Big Bang)	218–219
Lee Pil-mo	228
Seungri	235–236, 274
Yunho (TVXQ)	237, 259, 297, 300–301, 348, 378
Changmin (TVXQ)	237, 279-280
Dasom	245
Hwasa (Mamamoo)	247, 252, 256, 259, 269, 282, 292, 293, 300–301, 302, 308, 310, 312, 313, 317, 319–320, 326, 327, 336, 342–343, 353–354, 359, 361–362, 368, 380–381, 385, 392–393, 408, 415, 420, 421–422, 448, 458
Simon Dominic	249-250, 254–257, 260–261, 395, 401
Jung Ryeo-won	261, 269, 273
Jo Bin (Norazo)	266, 301
Microdot	268
Jae-gyun Hwang	277, 325–326, 379, 425
Yoon Kyun-sang	284
Jessi	286-287
Choi Jung-hoon (Jannabi)	289, 293, (300-301)
Lee Hong-gi (F.T. Island)	290
Hwang Min-hyun (NU'EST)	292
Jo Byung Gyu	294, 331
Austin Kang	296
Namkoong Min	298-299, 322–323, 413
Lee Yeon-hee	300-301
Lee Hye-ri	300-301
Joon Park	300-301
Im Soo-hyang	306, 323, 328, 332
Kwon Nara	318
Lee Sung-woo (No Brain)	315-316, 325–326, 330
Heo Ji Woong	316, 325-326
Wheein (Mamamoo)	247, 317
Kyung Soo-jin	318, 321, 324, 326, 336, 342, 369, 374, 402, 426, 441
Lee Jang-woo	323-324, 335, 352–353, 360, 386, 397, 411, 416, 427, 439–440, 442, 444 – 445, 450, 457, 465–466, 468, 475–476, 477, 484, 486–487, 493, 494–496, 500-501, 507, 517, 523, 525-526, 530-531, 537, 543-544, 551, 556, 571
Park Jeong-min	324
Son Ah-seop	325-326
Son Dam-bi	328, 333, 340–341, 345, 348, 355–356, 360, 367, 369, 388
Ji Hyun-woo	329
Jang Do-yeon	333, 339, 354, 355–356, 360, 369, 371, 383, 390
Kim Hyung Jun (Taesaja)	335
Kim Se-jeong	341
Ahn Bo-hyun	339-340, 345, 370
Song Seung-heon	258, 343, 344
Pak Se-ri	346, 353, 363, 372–373, 384, 426, 446, 451, 462, 473
Uee	349
Yoo Ah-in	350-351
Lee Kyu-hyung	355, 390
Kim Min-kyung	357, 363, 391, 410
Kwak Do-won	358-359, 394-395
Kim Young-kwang	362, 369
Wooyoung (2PM)	364, 369, 381
Kim Kwang-kyu	2, 3-4, 5-6, 7, 9, 10, 11, 12, 15, 16, 17, 19, 20, 21, 22, 24-25, 27, 28, 30, 31, 33, 35, 36-39, 40, 42, 44, 48, 50, 51, 53, 54, 56, 57, 58, 60, 62, 65, 67, 68, 71, 73, 77, 80, 82, 84, 85, 87, 91-92, 93, 96, 100, 101, 102, 105, 115, 365-366, 371, 385, 392–393, 440, 448, 453–454, 460, 474, 477, 485, 494-496, 503, 523
Lee Sang-yi	369
Seo Ji-hye	368
Kim Ji-hoon	370, 375, 387, 407, 461
Kai (EXO)	372
Park Eun-seok	380-381
Sohee	382
Key (SHINee)	388, 398, 405, 414, 415, 417, 418, 421, 422, 424, 434, 443, 444-445, 449, 455, 456, 461, 464, 473, 474, 477, 481, 483, 489, 494-496, 504, 510, 519, 528, 537, 546, 552, 573
Kang Daniel	396
Lee Ji-hoon	396
Nam Yoon-su	398, 428
Kim Ji-seok	399
Heo Hoon	401, 402, 411
Parc Jae-jung	403, 406, 417
Pyo Ye-jin	403
Kim Kyung-nam	407
Oh Sang-uk	409, 410
On Joo-wan	414, 433
Lee Eun-ji	416, 425, 432, 438
Anupam Tripathi	418
Honey J	430, 420, 437, 448, 455–456, 468, 482
Kim Eung-soo	421
Sandara Park	423, 439–440, 454
Lee Joo-seung	427, 433, 444–445, 455, 467, 477, 479–780, 483, 490, 494-496, 502, 512, 518, 532, 541, 555, 570
Code Kunst	429, 434, 439–440, 444, 449–450, 453, 460, 466, 472, 473, 477, 479–480, 483–484, 489–490, 491–492, 494–496, 499, 507, 513, 516, 522-523, 531, 539, 542, 549
Mino (Winner)	431, 438–439, 456, 482, 489-490
Cha Seo-won	432, 435, 439–440, 446, 455–456, 465, 469
Kwak Yoon-gy	436
Kim A-lang	436
Seol In-ah	443
Jeon So-yeon (I-dle)	445
Kim Hae-jun	452, 457-458
Hwang Hee-chan	459, 460
Chun Jung-myung	464, 478, 488
Lee Chan-hyuk (AKMU)	467, 509, 514
Lim Ju-hwan	469
Bae Da-bin	471, 480
Cho Gue-sung	475, 528-529
Lee Jong-won	479, 540
Lee You-jin	485, 488, 497, 521
Lee Chang-sub (BtoB)	487, 493, 513, 525, 548
Kim Dae-ho	491, 498, 509-510, 517, 521-522, 527, 530, 534, 545, 554, 556
Woo Do-hwan	492
Yun Sung-bin	498, 505, 516
Choi Jae-rim	502
Jin Ji-hee	506, 515
Jihyo (Twice)	508, 516, 530, 544
Hwang Bo-ra	508
Kim Sung-kyu (Infinite)	512
Park Hye-jeong	519
Kyuhyun (Super Junior)	529, 535, 553
Seolhyun	532
Danny Koo	534, 539, 549
Park Ji-hyeon	536, 543, 562, 567–568, 577, 582, 606, 619–620, 623, 633
Park Seo-ham	538
Ahn Jae-hyun	541, 545, 554, 563, 570
Doyoung (NCT)	542, 550, 564, 574
Goo Sung-Hwan	546, 551
Joo Hyun-young	547
Ko Jun	569, 573, 582
Yoon Ga-I	557, 566
Jo Aram	578
Joy (singer)	591, 594, 597, 602, 603, 605
J-Hope (BTS)	595

== Appearances ==
Guest	Episodes #
Seo In-guk	1, 16, 26
Jung Eun-ji	1
Son Jin-young	15
Baek Cheong-gang	15
Lee Tae-gwon	15
Koo Ja-myung	15
Kangta (H.O.T.)	18
Seung-hwan Oh	19
Mino (Freestyle)	21
Im Ha-ryong	23
Yoon Sang-hyun	24-25
Yang Yo-seob	24-25
John Park	24-25
Eun Ji-won	25
Jun Hyun-moo	25, 74, 83-84, 134, 140, 141, 145, 146, 148, 149, 151, 152, 159, 160, 163, 164, 166–168, 170, 173, 174, 177, 179–181, 183, 184, 190–197, 200–205, 207–210, 212, 213, 334, 442, 484, 539
Kim Jong-min	25
Kim Min-jong	24-25
Kim Heung-gook	25
Brave Brothers	25
Kim Na-young	25
Sumi Jo	28
Wink	28
Son Dong-woon (Highlight)	29, 449
Ha Jung-woo	29, 53, 89, 120, 125
Choi Yoo-ra	29
Lee Bong-ju	31
Jeong Hyeong-don	32
G.NA	32
Go Doo-shim	35, 61
Kim Hye-ja	35
Um Hong-gil	40
Hong Seok-cheon	42, 68
Lee Doo-hee	43
Lim Yo-hwan	43
Kim Ga-yeon	43
Lee Yoo-jin	44
Fabien	45, 70, 80
Lee Je-hoon	48
Kim Hyun-seok	51
Kim Ho-young	51
Seo In-seok	51
Kim In Tae	51
Hwang Bum-sik	51
Kim Won-bae	51
Jeong Yeong-suk	51
Eom Yong-su	51
Minuk	51
Lee Byung Chul	51
Im Byung Ki	51
Shin Goo	51
Nam Seong-jin	53, 81
Ki Tae-young	53
Ha Seok-jin	53, 70, 76, 92, 399
Kim Tae-won	1, 54, 67, 143, 371
Shim Hye-jin	55
Jang Hyun-sung	55
Ahn Pan-seok	55
Kim Hee-ae	55
Ryu Seung-soo	56, 57
Ok Taec-yeon (2pm)	56
Lee Seo-jin	56
Jeong Min-jun (No Brain)	57
Rose Motel members	58, 65, 81, 85, 137
Soyou	59, 70
Lee Soon-jae	61
Choi Hee	62
Roy Kim	63
Josh	63
Sunny (Girls' Generation)	64, 204
Julian Quintart	65, 74, 515
Hong Jinho	65, 90
Kwak Dong-yeon	66, 70, 80, 181
Kim Poong	66, 67
Son Ah-seop	67
Hwang Jae-gyun	67
Lee Jae-ryong	67
Yook Joong-wan	70
Shim Hyung-tak	70, 90, 178
Lee Tae-gon	71
Shin Sung-woo	73
Park Ji-woo	74
Kim Dong-jun	76
Park Ji-yoon	78
Lee Chang-hoon	78
Kim Ji-young	81
Im Ho	81
Park Jung-chul	90, 98
Lady Jane	90
Tae Jin-ah	93, 94
Yook Sungjae	94
Go Woo-ri	95
Myung Se-bin	95
Amber	95, 190, 192, 206
Kim Young-ae	95
Ahn Nae-sang	95
Jung Yong-hwa	96
Zhang Yu'an	97
Yura	102
Kim Sung-kyung	103
Lee Min-woo	103
Jun Jin	103, 123
Lee Hoon	106
Kim Hye-soo	106, 128
Suho	107
Ji Soo	107
Ryu Dam	109
Kim Kwang-kyu	1, 29, 69, 70, 115, 141, 143
Kim Sook	119
Kim Saeng-min	119
N	123
Go Hyun-jung	124
Shin Dong-yup	124
Kim Tae-jin	125, 127, 138
Kim In-suk	125
Angela Park	125
Kim Myeong Seon	127
Hwang Mi-yeong	128
Ma Dong-seok	128
Lee Jung-eun	128
Park Seo-joon	130
Yoo Jae-suk	132
Park Na-rae	137, 178, 180, 187, 194, 197, 199–201, 204–207, 210, 211, 213, 216, 441, 539
Ahn Young-mi	137
Jang Do-yeon	137, 181, 327, 333, 339
Lee Kye-in	139, 151
Kim Yong-gun	111, 140, 143, 149, 152, 159, 160, 163, 164, 166–168, 170, 173, 174, 177, 179, 181, 183, 184, 187, 190, 199, 200
Kim Young-chul	140, 143, 146, 148, 149, 151–153, 155, 159, 160, 164
Yuk Jung-wan	140, 143, 146, 147, 166, 200, 365, 371, 440
Cha In-Ho	140
Lee Guk-joo	140, 145–148, 151, 157, 159, 166, 168, 172, 174, 177, 179, 181, 199
Sam Kim	128, 141
Jung Gyu-woon	141
Im Won-hee	141
Sleepy	141, 158, 169
Lee Kyu-han	141
Hwang Jae Geun	142
Defconn	18, 143
Lee Sung-jae	1, 143
Seo Kang-joon	143
Lee Mal Nyeon	145, 184
Yang Hee-eun	145, 171
Seo Kyung-seok	145
ONGALS	145
Sam Hammington	145
Kim Dong-wan	147, 151
Jessi	147, 196
Seo Min-jung	148
Brave Girls	148, 391
Han Chae-ah	149, 152, 159, 160, 164, 166-168
Hwang Chi-yeul	149, 155
Zico	151
Chloë Grace Moretz	151
Shorry J	152
K.Will	154
Yoon Do-hyun	154, 319-320
Ali	154
Crush	155, 190
Dong Hyun Kim	155, 157
Roxane Mesquida	156
Kwon Jin-young	158
Roy Kim	160
Eddy Kim	160
Kim Jae-kyung (Rainbow)	160
Yoonhye (Rainbow)	160
Drug Restaurant's members	160
Joon Park (g.o.d)	161
Windy City's members	161, 165
Lee Jun-hyeok	161
Song Eun-i	113, 162
Jung Joo-ri	162
Kangnam	163, 200
Choi Kang-hee	164
Jisook (Rainbow)	165
Chun Myung-hoon (NRG)	166
Kian84	169, 171, 186, 187, 200, 201, 208, 212, 364, 414, 483
Kim Ban-jang	169
Kim Shin-young	169
Jang Woo-hyuk (H.O.T.)	170
Bewhy	170
Han Hye-jin (model)	171, 174, 184, 187, 191, 193, 196–198, 200–205, 210–213, 216, 367
Jung Kyung-ho	174
Kim Young-hee	174, 198
Kwak Hyun-hwa	174
Heo Anna	174
Kim Ji-min	174, 196, 198
V.One	177
Shim Hyung-tak	178
Lee Sung-min	179
Kim Sung-kyung	180
DinDin	181
Nam Bo-ra	181
Kwak Dong-yeon	181
Lee Si-eon	179, 181, 186, 191, 192, 193, 194–196, 198, 200, 201, 206, 209, 211, 216
AOA	182
Gummy	183
Jo Woo-jong	185
Jung Myung-hoon	185
Yoo Min-sang	185
Oh Na-mi	185, 391
Yoon Choon-ho	185
Steve J & Yoni P	185
Tyler James Williams	186
Annie Funke	186
Alana de la Garza	186
Kim Seung-hye	185
Lee Jong-suk	188
Uhm Jung-hwa	189
Lee Jong-beom	189
Jung Min-cheul	189, 198
Henry Lau (Super Junior-M)	191, 193, 197, 200, 201, 208, 213, 369
Beenzino	190
Yoon Doo-joon	191
Lee Gi-kwang	191, 192
Yoon Hyun-min	191–194, 206, 208, 216
Kim Sang-joong	193
Choi Woong	195
Eun Ji-won	197
Yang Se-hyung	198
Kim Gi-wook	198
Kim Joon-ho	198
Han Suk-joon	198, 462-463
Oh Sang-jin	198
Noh Hong-chul	18, 33, 70, 200
Daniel Henney	200, 248–250
Chansung (2PM)	202, 381
Junho (2PM)	202, 397, 411, 419
Ahn Young-mi	204
Kwak Si-yang	204
Kang Ki-young	204
Lee Hak-joo	204
Kim Sung-bum	204
Kim Su-ji	205, 412-413
Han Yoo-mi	205
Yang Hyo-jin	205, 412-413
Kim Sa-nee	205
Kim Yeon-koung	206
Jinyoung (B1A4)	206
Kim Chung Jae	209, 300-301
Han Hye-yeon	211
Namkoong Min	213
Han Ji-min	216
Taeyang	218–219
Seungri	219
Wanna One	220
Rain	223–224
Lee Si-young	235
Oh Jin-hwan (1TYM)	236
Son Ho-jun	237
Adam Rodriguez	239
Matthew Gray Gubler	239
Jang Yoon-ju	241
Lee Yoon-yi	241
YoonA (Girls' Generation)	254
Solar (Mamamoo)	247, 548
Moonbyul (Mamamoo)	247
Wheein (Mamamoo)	247, 317
Hwasa (Mamamoo)	259, 336, 415
HaHa	260
Byul	260
Son Dam-bi	261, 333, 335, 340, 341
Jung Hae-in	270
Xiumin (EXO)	279-280
BoA	297
Song Jin-woo	298
Kathryn Prescott	304-305
Hong Hyun-Hee	305–306, 338
Mijoo	312-313
Song Ga-in	314-315
Jung Ryeo-won	328, 340-341
Lee Sung-woo (No Brain)	330
Sandara Park	337, 505
Im Soo-hyang	337
Yang Se-chan	337, 371
Risabae	338
Nucksal	338
Sehun (EXO)	339-340
Gong Hyo-jin	340-341
Kim Hee-chul	43, 350
Song Byung-Chul	357, 391
Ryu Geun-Ji	357
Kang Daniel	369
Hwang Chan-sung	381
Hwang Shin-hye	386
Jeong Bo-seok	386
Taeyeon	388, 481
Sung Hoon	394, 415
Key (SHINee)	388, 398, 405, 414, 415, 417, 418, 421, 422, 424, 437, 443, 449, 455, 456, 461, 464, 473, 474, 477, 481, 483, 489, 495, 519, 528, 594, 599, 607
Yoon Do-hyun	395
Jinyoung (GOT7)	397
Taemin (SHINee)	398
Lee Ji-hoon	398
Kim Min-kyung	399
Lee Jang-won	399, 415
Hur Jae	401, 402
Kim Hee-jin	412-413
Parc Jae-jung	413, 414, 415
Lee Sang-yeob	414, 433
Kim Ji-seok	415
Park Ju-hyun	418
Kim Pyung-jo	418
Shin Gi-ru	419
CL	423
Rhee Dae-eun	425
Shim Woo-jun	425
Bae Jeong-Dae	425
Ryeoun	427
Jang Dong-yoon	427
Goo Sung-Hwan	427, 444–445, 455, 490
Minho (SHINee)	434, 449
Kim Hae-jun	438, 472
Code Kunst	442
Gaeko (Dynamic Duo)	444, 472
Kim Choong-Jae	451
The Korean Zombie	452-453
Sung Dong-il	454
Shin Seung-hwan	454
Yoon (Winner)	456
Mino (Winner)	470-471
Choiza (Dynamic Duo)	472
Bae Ho-young (Verivery)	480
Lee Chang-sub (BtoB)	481, 504, 513, 525
Chun Jung-myung	483
Lee Dong-hwi	484
Lee Hyo-jung	485
Woo Do-hwan	492
Lee Sang-yi	492
Lee Seung-hyung	493
Chun Woo-hee	495
Oh Se-keun	499
Kolleen Park	502
Son Woo-hyeon	502
Lee Jang-jun	503
NCT Dream	505
Jeongyeon	508
Yang Se-chan	514
Oh Eun-young	514
Alberto Mondi	515
Abhishek Gupta (television personality)	515
Daniel Lindemann	515
Takuya Terada	515
Renjun (NCT Dream)	519
Kany Diabaté Ahn	528
Kim Se-jeong	530
Kim Na-young (actress)	530
Danny Koo	537
Park Ji-hyeon	538
Doyoung (NCT)	554
Kim Dae-ho	542

== Ratings ==
In the ratings below, the highest rating for the show will be in red, and the lowest rating for the show will be in blue each year.

=== 2013 ===
List of ratings in 2013 (Pilot + Episode 1–37)

Episode #	Original airdate	TNMS ratings	AGB ratings
Pilot	February 10	7.0%	6.6%
1	March 22	5.5%	7.3%
2	March 29	4.9%	5.7%
3	April 5	7.1%	9.3%
4	April 12	5.9%	7.6%
5	April 19	5.8%	7.6%
6	May 3	5.8%	7.3%
7	May 10	6.0%	7.2%
8	May 17	6.7%	8.1%
9	May 24	6.1%	8.5%
10	May 31	5.7%	8.3%
11	June 7	6.1%	8.2%
12	June 14	6.1%	8.7%
13	June 21	5.5%	6.9%
14	June 28	4.8%	7.0%
15	July 5	6.5%	8.6%
16	July 12	6.6%	9.0%
17	July 19	6.9%	8.9%
18	July 26	7.1%	11.4%
19	August 2	6.0%	7.8%
20	August 9	4.8%	8.2%
21	August 16	4.4%	6.7%
22	August 23	7.0%	7.9%
23	August 30	5.7%	9.9%
24	September 6	6.6%	9.7%
25	September 13	5.7%	9.2%
26	September 27	6.3%	8.3%
27	October 4	6.2%	9.0%
28	October 11	6.1%	7.1%
29	October 18	6.7%	8.4%
30	October 25	6.2%	7.7%
31	November 1	5.9%	7.8%
32	November 15	6.4%	7.6%
33	November 22	8.5%	9.2%
34	November 29	7.2%	8.5%
35	December 13	8.5%	9.6%
36	December 20	6.2%	7.1%
37	December 27	5.8%	7.1%

=== 2014 ===
List of ratings in 2014 (Episode 38–85)

Episode #	Original airdate	TNMS ratings	AGB ratings
38	January 3	7.2%	8.4%
39	January 10	7.6%	8.5%
40	January 17	8.1%	9.2%
41	January 24	8.6%	9.1%
42	February 7	5.2%	6.8%
43	February 14	6.5%	7.4%
44	February 28	7.3%	8.2%
45	March 7	7.3%	8.5%
46	March 14	6.3%	7.5%
47	March 21	6.3%	7.9%
48	March 28	6.6%	8.3%
49	April 4	5.8%	6.8%
50	April 11	8.0%	8.2%
51	April 25	5.5%	6.7%
52	May 2	4.8%	6.3%
53	May 9	5.9%	7.8%
54	May 16	7.2%	6.8%
55	May 23	7.2%	8.2%
56	May 30	8.3%	8.8%
57	June 6	6.3%	6.4%
58	June 13	7.8%	9.2%
59	June 27	5.7%	6.7%
60	July 4	7.1%	6.8%
61	July 11	6.8%	7.2%
62	July 18	5.5%	6.2%
63	July 25	5.3%	5.5%
64	August 1	7.1%	6.2%
65	August 8	7.2%	7.5%
66	August 15	7.9%	8.6%
67	August 22	7.3%	6.7%
68	August 29	7.6%	9.1%
69	September 5	8.3%	8.6%
70	September 12	7.0%	6.8%
71	September 19	6.7%	6.7%
72	September 26	7.4%	9.5%
73	October 3	7.2%	7.6%
74	October 10	8.3%	8.2%
75	October 17	5.7%	6.3%
76	October 24	9.2%	8.6%
77	October 31	8.1%	8.7%
78	November 7	8.2%	8.5%
79	November 14	7.6%	7.7%
80	November 21	7.4%	7.6%
81	November 28	7.3%	8.5%
82	December 5	8.1%	7.4%
83	December 12	8.1%	8.2%
84	December 19	7.0%	7.9%
85	December 26	7.8%	8.9%

=== 2015 ===
List of ratings in 2015 (Episode 86–137)

Episode #	Original airdate	AGB ratings	TNMS ratings
86	January 2	10.0%	9.0%
87	January 9	11.7%	10.8%
88	January 16	10.6%	10.3%
89	January 23	9.4%	10.0%
90	January 30	11.3%	9.9%
91	February 6	9.7%	9.0%
92	February 13	9.5%	9.4%
93	February 20	12.3%	11.0%
94	February 27	9.9%	10.6%
95	March 6	9.9%	9.4%
96	March 13	8.8%	8.3%
97	March 20	8.5%	9.5%
98	March 27	7.6%	8.7%
99	April 3	8.9%	10.1%
100	April 10	9.5%	8.8%
101	April 17	7.5%	7.7%
102	April 24	7.0%	6.9%
103	May 1	8.8%	7.4%
104	May 8	9.7%	9.7%
105	May 15	9.4%	8.7%
106	May 22	10.5%	10.1%
107	May 29	10.0%	10.3%
108	June 5	9.8%	9.3%
109	June 12	8.7%	8.6%
110	June 19	10.1%	9.9%
111	June 26	9.0%	8.8%
112	July 3	8.6%	10.0%
113	July 10	8.3%	8.9%
114	July 17	7.8%	7.7%
115	July 24	9.7%	8.2%
116	July 31	8.4%	7.9%
117	August 7	8.2%	8.8%
118	August 14	8.2%	8.8%
119	August 21	8.2%	7.8%
120	August 28	7.9%	6.9%
121	September 4	7.6%	7.1%
122	September 11	7.1%	6.6%
123	September 18	6.2%	5.5%
124	September 25	6.8%	5.3%
125	October 2	5.5%	5.1%
126	October 9	9.0%	8.5%
127	October 16	8.3%	7.5%
128	October 23	8.9%	7.9%
129	October 30	8.5%	7.2%
130	November 6	8.7%	7.4%
131	November 13	6.3%	5.8%
132	November 20	7.4%	6.5%
133	November 27	6.9%	5.3%
134	December 4	7.1%	6.9%
135	December 11	7.3%	5.6%
136	December 18	7.7%	5.7%
137	December 25	8.4%	5.6%

=== 2016 ===
List of ratings in 2016 (Episode 138–187)

Episode #	Original airdate	AGB ratings	TNMS ratings
138	January 1	8.1%	6.4%
139	January 8	7.8%	5.4%
140	January 15	7.1%	6.4%
141	January 22	6.7%	6.2%
142	January 29	8.3%	7.3%
143	February 5	6.9%	6.5%
144	February 12	8.0%	6.8%
145	February 19	7.4%	6.4%
146	February 26	9.2%	7.4%
147	March 4	7.9%	7.3%
148	March 11	8.1%	6.5%
149	March 18	9.3%	7.2%
150	March 25	8.4%	7.3%
151	April 1	6.8%	5.7%
152	April 8	8.0%	6.1%
153	April 15	7.1%	5.2%
154	April 22	6.5%	5.4%
155	April 29	8.4%	6.3%
156	May 6	7.5%	6.9%
157	May 13	7.0%	6.5%
158	May 20	6.0%	5.5%
159	May 27	6.7%	5.2%
160	June 3	7.6%	5.8%
161	June 10	6.1%	5.5%
162	June 17	6.2%	5.8%
163	June 24	6.9%	5.3%
164	July 1	6.4%	5.1%
165	July 8	5.9%	5.2%
166	July 15	5.9%	4.9%
167	July 22	6.2%	5.3%
168	July 29	7.4%	6.4%
169	August 5	7.3%	6.9%
170	August 26	6.0%	5.1%
171	September 2	6.2%	4.8%
172	September 9	5.5%	5.6%
173	September 16	6.3%	6.6%
174	September 23	7.0%	7.0%
175	September 30	6.5%	6.3%
176	October 7	7.2%	5.8%
177	October 14	4.3%	3.5%
178	October 21	5.6%	4.6%
179	October 28	5.8%	5.5%
180	November 4	5.9%	5.8%
181	November 11	7.3%	7.0%
182	November 18	6.7%	5.7%
183	November 25	7.4%	6.4%
184	December 2	6.7%	5.9%
185	December 9	7.1%	6.1%
186	December 16	8.0%	7.1%
187	December 23	6.5%	6.1%

=== 2017 ===
List of ratings in 2017 (Episode 188–226)

Episode #	Original airdate	AGB ratings	TNMS ratings
188	January 6	6.5%	5.8%
189	January 13	5.9%	5.6%
190	January 20	7.1%	5.6%
191	January 27	7.5%	6.6%
192	February 3	7.1%	6.1%
193	February 17	6.3%	4.8%
194	February 24	5.0%	4.2%
195	March 3	6.2%	4.8%
196	March 17	5.4%	4.8%
197	March 24	6.7%	5.6%
198	March 31	6.0%	4.6%
199	April 7	6.0%	5.1%
200	April 14	7.4%	6.4%
201	April 21	7.8%	6.8%
202	April 28	7.0%	6.1%
203	May 5	7.7%	6.1%
204	May 12	7.4%	6.4%
205	May 19	8.2%	7.4%
206	May 26	7.3%	6.3%
207	June 2	7.0%	5.8%
208	June 9	7.6%	6.4%
209	June 16	7.3%	5.4%
210	June 23	9.4%	8.4%
211	June 30	10.2%	8.1%
212	July 7	9.2%	6.7%
213	July 14	9.1%	8.0%
214	July 21	9.5%	8.6%
215	July 28	8.8%	7.4%
216	August 4	10.6%	8.5%
217	August 11	11.0%	8.8%
218	August 18	10.0%	7.8%
219	August 25	11.5%	9.7%
220	September 1	11.0%	9.2%
221	November 17	8.8%	7.8%
222	November 24	8.6%	7.1%
223	December 1	7.2%	6.7%
224	December 8	8.6%	8.3%
225	December 15	10.7%	9.8%
226	December 22	9.8%	8.9%

=== 2018 ===
List of ratings in 2018 (Episode 227–274)

Episode #	Original airdate	TNMS ratings	AGB ratings
227	January 5	13.6%	13.2%
228	January 12	13.6%	12.8%
229	January 19	12.3%	12.4%
230	January 26	11.6%	11.4%
231	February 2	12.2%	12.3%
232	February 9	12.4%	12.2%
233	February 16	10.9%	10.1%
234	March 2 (Note: Episode was pushed back a week due to the 2018 PyeongChang Olympic.)	15.5%	15.5%
235	March 9	13.0%	12.5%
236	March 16	10.6%	10.5%
237	March 23	11.0%	11.6%
238	March 30	12.5%	10.6%
239	April 6	12.0%	10.8%
240	April 13	10.7%	9.6%
241	April 20	10.1%	9.9%
242	May 4 (Note: Episode was pushed back a week due to the 2018 Inter Korean Summit)	9.5%	8.8%
243	May 11	9.4%	9.3%
244	May 18	9.3%	8.3%
245	May 25	9.7%	9.8%
246	June 1	9.0%	7.8%
247	June 8	11.0%	10.0%
248	June 15	10.5%	9.6%
249	June 22	10.0%	10.3%
250	June 29	10.3%	10.5%
251	July 13 (Note: Episode was pushed back a week due to the 2018 FIFA World Cup)	10.2%	10.6%
252	July 20	10.2%	9.9%
253	July 27	10.5%	8.9%
254	August 3	10.3%	10.6%
255	August 10	9.1%	9.9%
256	August 17	9.0%	10.1%
257	August 24	13.0%	14.4%
258	August 31	14.1%	15.2%
259	September 7	12.0%	13.2%
260	September 14	N/R	11.8%
261	September 21	N/R	12.8%
262	September 28	N/R	11.4%
263	October 5	N/R	12.0%
264	October 12	N/R	10.7%
265	October 26 (Note: Episode was pushed back a week due to the baseball match)	N/R	12.0%
266	November 2	N/R	12.3%
267	November 9	N/R	12.5%
268	November 16	N/R	12.4%
269	November 23	N/R	10.2%
270	November 30	N/R	11.6%
271	December 7	N/R	12.6%
272	December 14	N/R	12.7%
273	December 21	N/R	13.5%
274	December 28	N/R	9.9%

=== 2019 ===
List of ratings in 2019 (Episode 275–325)

Episode #	Original airdate	AGB ratings
275	January 4	15.5%
276	January 11	12.6%
277	January 18	12.2%
278	January 25	14.0%
279	February 2	8.8%
280	February 8	14.9%
281	February 15	14.3%
282	February 23	11.5%
283	March 1	10.9%
284	March 9	13.5%
285	March 15	11.9%
286	March 22	12.5%
287	March 29	12.8%
288	April 5	11.2%
289	April 12	10.7%
290	April 19	10.0%
291	April 26	11.4%
292	May 3	9.8%
293	May 10	10.9%
294	May 17	10.2%
295	May 24	9.7%
296	May 31	9.8%
297	June 8	9.0%
298	June 14	10.8%
299	June 21	10.8%
300	June 28	10.5%
301	July 5	10.2%
302	July 12	10.6%
303	July 19	10.0%
304	July 26	10.6%
305	August 2	9.1%
306	August 9	9.8%
307	August 16	10.4%
308	August 23	9.6%
309	August 30	9.0%
310	September 6	8.7%
311	September 13	8.4%
312	September 20	8.6%
313	September 27	8.2%
314	October 4	11.1%
315	October 11	10.0%
316	October 18	9.2%
317	October 25	9.6%
318	November 1	9.4%
319	November 8	10.2%
320	November 15	8.6%
321	November 22	9.7%
322	November 29	9.3%
323	December 6	10.0%
324	December 13	10.9%
325	December 20	10.5%
326	December 27	10.5%

=== 2020 ===
List of ratings in 2020 (Episode 327–377)

Episode #	Original airdate	AGB ratings
327	January 3	12.4%
328	January 10	12.9%
329	January 17	11.2%
330	January 24	7.3%
331	January 31	12.0%
332	February 7	10.9%
333	February 14	12.3%
334	February 21	11.0%
335	February 28	11.4%
336	March 6	10.7%
337	March 13	10.7%
338	March 20	10.1%
339	March 27	11.6%
340	April 3	11.5%
341	April 10	8.8%
342	April 17	9.0%
343	April 24	9.0%
344	May 8	8.7%
345	May 15	6.7%
346	May 22	11.1%
347	May 29	11.3%
348	June 5	11.0%
349	June 12	11.9%
350	June 19	12.7%
351	June 26	12.0%
352	July 3	10.0%
353	July 10	10.8%
354	July 17	8.7%
355	July 24	10.4%
356	July 31	9.8%
357	August 7	9.6%
358	August 14	9.7%
359	August 21	8.8%
360	August 28	10.1%
361	September 4	7.1%
362	September 11	7.5%
363	September 18	8.1%
364	September 25	7.4%
365	October 2	10.0%
366	October 9	9.4%
367	October 16	7.9%
368	October 23	9.5%
369	October 30	8.6%
370	November 6	7.6%
371	November 13	8.7%
372	November 20	8.2%
373	November 27	8.2%
374	December 4	8.9%
375	December 11	8.9%
376	December 18	9.6%
377	December 25	8.4%

=== 2021 ===
List of ratings in 2021 (Episode 378–427)

Episode #	Original airdate	AGB ratings
378	January 8	9.9%
379	January 15	10.0%
380	January 22	12.2%
381	January 29	9.5%
382	February 5	9.5%
383	February 12	9.0%
384	February 19	11.3%
385	February 26	8.3%
386	March 5	8.5%
387	March 12	6.5%
388	March 19	8.8%
389	March 26	8.0%
390	April 2	7.6%
391	April 9	7.6%
392	April 16	6.8%
393	April 23	6.5%
394	April 30	9.0%
395	May 7	8.7%
396	May 14	9.7%
397	May 21	8.6%
398	May 28	7.9%
399	June 4	9.0%
400	June 11	8.1%
401	June 18	7.2%
402	June 25	8.7%
403	July 2	7.3%
404	July 9	8.5%
405	July 16	7.1%
406	July 30	7.6%
407	August 6	5.6%
408	August 13	7.8%
409	August 20	8.9%
410	August 27	8.5%
411	September 3	7.8%
412	September 10	11.7%
413	September 17	7.9%
414	September 24	7.5%
415	October 1	8.2%
416	October 8	6.7%
417	October 15	7.1%
418	October 22	6.8%
419	October 29	7.0%
420	November 5	6.2%
421	November 12	5.0%
422	November 19	4.2%
423	November 26	6.3%
424	December 3	6.0%
425	December 10	6.5%
426	December 17	7.3%
427	December 24	6.6%

=== 2022 ===
List of ratings in 2022 (Episode 428–476)

Episode #	Original airdate	AGB ratings
428	January 7	7.9%
429	January 14	8.3%
430	January 21	8.2%
431	January 28	8.1%
432	February 4	6.4%
433	February 11	7.1%
434	February 18	7.1%
435	February 25	7.4%
436	March 4	8.3%
437	March 11	6.8%
438	March 25	6.8%
439	April 1	7.8%
440	April 8	8.2%
441	April 15	6.9%
442	April 22	7.7%
443	April 29	6.9%
444	May 6	6.5%
445	May 13	5.8%
446	May 20	6.3%
447	May 27	6.5%
448	June 3	7.8%
449	June 10	8.0%
450	June 17	7.6%
451	June 25	8.3%
452	July 1	7.2%
453	July 8	7.8%
454	July 15	8.1%
455	July 22	8.0%
456	July 29	7.2%
457	August 5	7.0%
458	August 12	6.8%
459	August 19	8.4%
460	August 26	7.8%
461	September 2	8.5%
462	September 9	7.0%
463	September 16	7.5%
464	September 23	7.1%
465	September 30	7.2%
466	October 7	7.0%
467	October 14	7.7%
468	October 21	6.3%
469	October 28	6.5%
470	November 11 (Note: Episode was pushed back a week due to the national mourning after Seoul Halloween crowd crush)	8.1%
471	November 18	6.9%
472	November 25	7.1%
473	December 9 (Note: Episode was pushed back a week due to the 2022 FIFA World Cup)	7.4%
474	December 16	6.8%
475	December 23	8.3%
476	December 30	9.2%

=== 2023 ===
List of ratings in 2023 (Episode 477–526)

Episode #	Original airdate	AGB ratings
477	January 6	8.8%
478	January 13	8.0%
479	January 20	7.7%
480	January 27	7.7%
481	February 3	8.0%
482	February 10	7.5%
483	February 17	7.3%
484	February 24	8.2%
485	March 3	8.3%
486	March 17	8.4%
487	March 24	8.9%
488	March 31	7.6%
489	April 7	7.6%
490	April 14	8.3%
491	April 21	7.9%
492	April 28	7.7%
493	May 5	7.3%
494	May 12	8.4%
495	May 19	7.3%
496	May 26	7.3%
497	June 2	7.8%
498	June 9	8.6%
499	June 16	7.8%
500	June 23	7.8%
501	June 30	9.1%
502	July 7	8.2%
503	July 14	8.6%
504	July 21	9.0%
505	July 28	7.1%
506	August 4	6.9%
507	August 11	7.8%
508	August 18	7.8%
509	August 25	8.0%
510	September 1	8.8%
511	September 8	7.5%
512	September 15	5.8%
513	September 22	6.5%
514	September 29	6.3%
515	October 6	6.0%
516	October 13	6.9%
517	October 20	8.0%
518	October 27	8.5%
519	November 3	7.0%
520	November 10	7.0%
521	November 17	8.0%
522	November 24	7.0%
523	December 1	6.8%
524	December 8	7.8%
525	December 15	8.5%
526	December 22	8.0%

=== 2024 ===
List of ratings in 2024 (Episode 527–576)

Episode #	Original airdate	AGB ratings
527	January 5	8.2%
528	January 12	8.8%
529	January 19	9.4%
530	January 26	9.6%
531	February 2	9.0%
532	February 9	6.2%
533	February 16	8.8%
534	February 23	8.9%
535	March 1	8.0%
536	March 8	8.3%
537	March 15	9.3%
538	March 22	7.9%
539	March 29	7.4%
540	April 5	7.6%
541	April 12	8.2%
542	April 19	7.0%
543	April 26	8.7%
544	May 3	8.1%
545	May 10	6.8%
546	May 17	8.3%
547	May 24	7.2%
548	May 31	7.3%
549	June 7	6.9%
550	June 14	7.3%
551	June 21	7.5%
552	June 28	8.2%
553	July 5	8.1%
554	July 12	7.0%
555	July 19	7.3%
556	July 26	7.9%
557	August 9	6.8%
558	August 16	8.0%
559	August 23	7.6%
560	August 30	7.8%
561	September 6	8.2%
562	September 13	7.6%
563	September 20	8.0%
564	September 27	5.5%
565	October 4	6.4%
566	October 11	8.0%
567	October 18	6.5%
568	October 25	6.2%
569	November 1	7.4%
570	November 8	6.2%
571	November 15	8.3%
572	November 22	8.5%
573	November 29	7.7%
574	December 13	7.4%
575	December 20	7.0%
576	December 27	7.5%

=== 2025 ===
List of ratings in 2025 (Episode 577–present)

Episode #	Original airdate	AGB ratings
577	January 3	5.6%
578	January 10	7.6%
579	January 17	7.8%
580	January 24	9.2%
581	January 31	7.5%
582	February 7	7.6%
583	February 14	7.8%
584	February 21	7.9%
585	February 28	8.0%
586	March 7	7.3%
587	March 14	7.0%
588	March 21	6.0%
589	March 28	6.4%
590	April 4	6.8%
591	April 11	5.0%
592	April 18	5.7%
593	April 25	5.4%
594	May 2	5.6%
595	May 9	5.5%
596	May 16	5.6%
597	May 23	6.2%
598	May 30	5.6%
599	June 6	6.1%
600	June 13	5.9%
601	June 20	5.0%
602	June 27	5.8%
603	July 4	6.9%
604	July 11	5.5%
605	July 18	6.0%
606	July 25	6.0%

== Awards and nominations ==
Year	Award	Category	Recipients	Result
2013	13th MBC Entertainment Awards	Excellence Award in a Variety Show	Kim Kwang-kyu	Won
2014	14th MBC Entertainment Awards	Excellence Award in a Variety Show	Jun Hyun-moo	Won
2014	14th MBC Entertainment Awards	New Star Award	Yuk Jung-wan	Won
2014	14th MBC Entertainment Awards	New Star Award	Fabien Yoon	Won
2014	14th MBC Entertainment Awards	New Star Award	Kangnam	Won
2015	51st Baeksang Arts Awards	Best Male Variety Performer	Jun Hyun-moo	Won
2015	15th MBC Entertainment Awards	Excellence Award in a Variety Show	Kim Dong-wan	Won
2015	15th MBC Entertainment Awards	Excellence Award in a Variety Show	Hwang Seok-jeong	Won
2016	16th MBC Entertainment Awards	Program of the Year	I Live Alone	Won
2016	16th MBC Entertainment Awards	Top Female Excellence Award in Variety Show	Lee Guk-joo	Won
2016	16th MBC Entertainment Awards	Top Female Excellence Award in Variety Show	Han Chae-ah	Won
2016	16th MBC Entertainment Awards	Top Female Excellence Award in Variety Show	Han Hye-jin	Won
2016	16th MBC Entertainment Awards	Popularity Award	Han Hye-jin	Won
2016	16th MBC Entertainment Awards	Special Award	Jun Hyun-moo	Won
2016	16th MBC Entertainment Awards	Male Excellence Award in Variety Show	Jun Hyun-moo	Won
2016	16th MBC Entertainment Awards	Male Excellence Award in Variety Show	Sleepy	Won
2016	16th MBC Entertainment Awards	Female Excellence Award in Variety Show	Park Na-rae	Won
2016	16th MBC Entertainment Awards	Female Excellence Award in Variety Show	Lee So-ra	Won
2016	16th MBC Entertainment Awards	Male Rookie Award in Variety Show	Lee Si-eon	Won
2016	16th MBC Entertainment Awards	Best Couple Award	Sleepy and Lee Guk-joo	Won
2017	53rd Baeksang Arts Awards	Best Entertainment Program	I Live Alone	Won
2017	53rd Baeksang Arts Awards	Best Variety Performer - Female	Park Na-rae	Won
2017	17th MBC Entertainment Awards	Grand Prize (Daesang)	Jun Hyun-moo	Won
2017	17th MBC Entertainment Awards	Grand Prize (Daesang)	Park Na-rae	Won
2017	17th MBC Entertainment Awards	Program of the Year	I Live Alone	Won
2017	17th MBC Entertainment Awards	Scriptwriter of the Year	Lee Kyung-ha	Won
2017	17th MBC Entertainment Awards	Top Excellence Award, Variety Category	Jun Hyun-moo	Won
2017	17th MBC Entertainment Awards	Top Excellence Award, Variety Category	Park Na-rae	Won
2017	17th MBC Entertainment Awards	Excellence Award, Variety Category	Henry Lau	Won
2017	17th MBC Entertainment Awards	Excellence Award, Variety Category	Han Hye-jin	Won
2017	17th MBC Entertainment Awards	Rookie Award, Variety Category	Lee Si-eon	Won
2017	17th MBC Entertainment Awards	Rookie Award, Variety Category	Kian84	Won
2017	17th MBC Entertainment Awards	Rookie Award, Variety Category	Kim Yeon-koung	Won
2017	17th MBC Entertainment Awards	Best Couple Award	Kian84 and Park Na-rae	Won
2017	17th MBC Entertainment Awards	Best Couple Award	Jun Hyun-moo and Han Hye-jin	Won
2018	54th Baeksang Arts Awards	Best Entertainment Program	I Live Alone	Nominated
2018	54th Baeksang Arts Awards	Best Variety Performer – Male	Jun Hyun-moo	Won
2018	54th Baeksang Arts Awards	Best Variety Performer – Female	Park Na-rae	Won
2018	18th MBC Entertainment Awards	Grand Prize (Daesang)	Jun Hyun-moo	Nominated
2018	18th MBC Entertainment Awards	Grand Prize (Daesang)	Park Na-rae	Won
2018	18th MBC Entertainment Awards	Program of the Year	I Live Alone	Won
2018	18th MBC Entertainment Awards	Top Excellence Award, Variety Category (Males)	Lee Si-eon	Won
2018	18th MBC Entertainment Awards	Top Excellence Award, Variety Category (Females)	Han Hye-jin	Won
2018	18th MBC Entertainment Awards	Excellence Award, Variety Category (Males)	Kian84	Won
2018	18th MBC Entertainment Awards	Rookie Award, Variety Category (Males)	Sung Hoon	Won
2018	18th MBC Entertainment Awards	Rookie Award, Variety Category (Females)	Hwasa	Won
2018	18th MBC Entertainment Awards	Best Entertainer Award (Variety)	Sung Hoon	Won
2018	18th MBC Entertainment Awards	Entertainer of the Year Award	Jun Hyun-moo	Won
2018	18th MBC Entertainment Awards	Entertainer of the Year Award	Park Na-rae	Won
2018	18th MBC Entertainment Awards	Best Couple Award	Park Na-rae & Kian84	Won
2018	18th MBC Entertainment Awards	Best Couple Award	Park Na-rae & Kim Choong-jae	Won
2019	55th Baeksang Arts Awards	Best Entertainment Program	I Live Alone	Won
2019	55th Baeksang Arts Awards	Best Variety Performer – Female	Park Na-rae	Won
2019	19th MBC Entertainment Awards	Grand Prize (Daesang)	Park Na-rae	Won
2019	19th MBC Entertainment Awards	Program of the Year	I Live Alone	Won
2019	19th MBC Entertainment Awards	Top Excellence Award, Variety Category (Males)	Lee Si-eon	Won
2019	19th MBC Entertainment Awards	Top Excellence Award, Variety Category (Males)	Kian84	Won
2019	19th MBC Entertainment Awards	Excellence Award, Variety Category (Males)	Sung Hoon	Won
2019	19th MBC Entertainment Awards	Excellence Award, Variety Category (Females)	Hwasa	Won
2019	19th MBC Entertainment Awards	Multi-tainer Award	Han Hye-yeon	Won
2019	19th MBC Entertainment Awards	Multi-tainer Award	Kim Chung-jae	Won
2019	19th MBC Entertainment Awards	Entertainer Of The Year Award	Park Na-rae	Won
2019	19th MBC Entertainment Awards	Best Teamwork Award	Henry Lau	Won
2019	19th MBC Entertainment Awards	Best Teamwork Award	Kian84	Won
2019	19th MBC Entertainment Awards	Best Teamwork Award	Lee Si-eon	Won
2019	19th MBC Entertainment Awards	Best Teamwork Award	Sung Hoon	Won
2019	19th MBC Entertainment Awards	Best Couple Award	Henry Lau & Kian84	Won
2020	56th Baeksang Arts Awards	Best Variety Performer – Female	Park Na-rae	Won
2020	20th MBC Entertainment Awards	Grand Prize (Daesang)	Park Na-rae	Nominated
2020	20th MBC Entertainment Awards	Best Entertainer Award	Park Na-rae	Won
2020	20th MBC Entertainment Awards	Program of the Year	I Live Alone	Nominated
2020	20th MBC Entertainment Awards	Top Excellence Award, Variety Category (Males)	Sung Hoon	Won
2020	20th MBC Entertainment Awards	Top Excellence Award, Variety Category (Males)	Lee Si-eon	Nominated
2020	20th MBC Entertainment Awards	Top Excellence Award, Variety Category (Females)	Hwasa	Won
2020	20th MBC Entertainment Awards	Top Excellence Award, Variety Category (Females)	Han Hye-jin	Nominated
2020	20th MBC Entertainment Awards	Excellence Award, Variety Category (Females)	Son Dam-bi	Won
2020	20th MBC Entertainment Awards	Excellence Award, Variety Category (Females)	Jang Do-yeon	Won
2020	20th MBC Entertainment Awards	Excellence Award, Variety Category (Females)	Kyung Soo-jin	Nominated
2020	20th MBC Entertainment Awards	Rookie Award, Variety Category (Male)	Ahn Bo-hyun	Nominated
2020	20th MBC Entertainment Awards	Digital Content Award	Park Na-rae, Hwasa & Han Hye-jin (Home Alone: Girls' Secret Party)	Won
2020	20th MBC Entertainment Awards	Best Couple Award	Sung Hoon & Son Dam-bi	Nominated
2021	57th Baeksang Arts Awards	Best Variety Performer – Female	Jang Do-yeon	Won
2021	48th Korea Broadcasting Awards	Best Female Reality Star	Hwasa	Won
2021	21st MBC Entertainment Awards	Grand Prize (Daesang)	Jun Hyun-moo	Nominated
2021	21st MBC Entertainment Awards	Grand Prize (Daesang)	Park Na-rae	Nominated
2021	21st MBC Entertainment Awards	Entertainer of the Year	Jun Hyun-moo	Nominated
2021	21st MBC Entertainment Awards	Entertainer of the Year	Park Na-rae	Nominated
2021	21st MBC Entertainment Awards	Program of the Year	I Live Alone	Nominated
2021	21st MBC Entertainment Awards	Top Excellence Award, Variety Category (Male)	Kian84	Won
2021	21st MBC Entertainment Awards	Rookie Award	Parc Jae-jung	Won
2021	21st MBC Entertainment Awards	Popularity Award	Key	Won
2021	21st MBC Entertainment Awards	Popularity Award	Sandara Park	Won
2021	21st MBC Entertainment Awards	PD's Award	I Live Alone	Won
2021	21st MBC Entertainment Awards	Best Couple Award	Key & Kian84	Nominated
2022	Brand of the Year Awards 2022	Observation Entertainment Program of the Year	I Live Alone	Won
2022	Korea Advertisers Association Awards	Good Program Award	I Live Alone	Won
2022	22nd MBC Entertainment Awards	Grand Prize (Daesang)	Jun Hyun-moo	Won
2022	22nd MBC Entertainment Awards	Grand Prize (Daesang)	Park Na-rae	Nominated
2022	22nd MBC Entertainment Awards	Entertainer of the Year	Jun Hyun-moo	Won
2022	22nd MBC Entertainment Awards	Entertainer of the Year	Park Na-rae	Won
2022	22nd MBC Entertainment Awards	Program of the Year	I Live Alone	Won
2022	22nd MBC Entertainment Awards	Excellence Award, Variety Category (Male)	Key	Won
2022	22nd MBC Entertainment Awards	Rookie Award, Variety Category (Male)	Code Kunst	Won
2022	22nd MBC Entertainment Awards	Rookie Award, Variety Category (Male)	Lee Joo-seung	Nominated
2022	22nd MBC Entertainment Awards	Popularity Award	Lee Jang-woo	Won
2022	22nd MBC Entertainment Awards	Multiplayer Award	Kian84	Won
2022	22nd MBC Entertainment Awards	Best Couple Award	Jun Hyun-moo, Park Na-rae & Lee Jang-woo	Won
