= Kim So-hee =

- Hangul: 김소희
- RR: Gim Sohui
- MR: Kim Sohŭi

Kim So-hee or Kim So-hui may refer to:

- Kim So-hee (singer, born 1917), a.k.a. Kim Sun-ok (1917–1995), Korean traditional musician for Pansori
- Kim Sohyi (born 1965), South Korean chef
- Kim So-hee (speed skater) (born 1976), South Korean short track speed skater
- Kim So-hee (taekwondo, born 1992), South Korean taekwondo practitioner
- Kim So-hui (taekwondo, born 1994), South Korean taekwondo practitioner
- Kim So-hee (singer, born 1995), South Korean singer
- Kim So-hee (singer, born 1999), South Korean singer and member of Elris
- Gim So-hui (born 1996), South Korean alpine skier
- Kim So-hee (actress) (born 2000), South Korean actress
