= My Holo Love =

2020 South Korean television series

- Promotional poster
- Hangul: 나 홀로 그대
- Lit.: I Holo You
- RR: Na hollo geudae
- MR: Na hollo kŭdae
- Genre: Science fiction; Romance
- Written by: Ryu Yong-jae; Kim Hwan-chae; Choi Sung-joon
- Directed by: Lee Sang-yeop; Yoon Jong-ho
- Starring: Yoon Hyun-min; Ko Sung-hee
- Country of origin: South Korea
- Original language: Korean
- No. of episodes: 12

Production
- Executive producer: Lee Hye-young
- Producer: Jinnie Choi
- Production location: Korea
- Editor: DK
- Camera setup: Single camera
- Running time: 49-57 minutes
- Production company: Studio Dragon

Original release
- Network: Netflix
- Release: February 7, 2020

My Holo Love (Korean: 나 홀로 그대) is a 2020 South Korean television series starring Yoon Hyun-min and Ko Sung-hee. It was released on Netflix on February 7, 2020.

== Synopsis ==
Because of her face blindness disorder, Han So-yeon decided to live a reclusive life. This changes when she starts using the AI program Holo whose appearance is the same as the developer, Ko Nan-do. The latter slowly falls in love with So-yeon but his cold personality, which contrasts with Holo's, isn't in his favor.

== Cast ==
=== Main ===
- Yoon Hyun-min as Ko Nan-do / Holo
- Ko Sung-hee as Han So-yeon
  - Kim Ha-yeon as young So-yeon

=== Supporting ===
- Choi Yeo-jin as Ko Yoo-jin
- Hwang Chan-sung as Baek Chan-sung
- Lee Jung-eun as So-yeon's mother
- Kang Seung-hyun as Yoo-ram
- Kim Yong-min as assistant
- Kim Soo-jin as Nan-do's mother
- Son Jong-hak as Nam Gi-ho
- Yang Dae-hyuk as Lee Dong-shik
- Jung Young-ki as Jo Jin-seok
- Jung Yeon-joo as Detective Ji-na
- Nam Myung-ryul as Baek Nam-gyu
- Gong Min-jeung as Choi Seung-kwon
- Lee Yoo-mi as Ji-hye

=== Special appearances ===
- Lee Ki-chan as Yeon Gang-woo (Ep. 1–4)
- Kim Yong-man (Ep. 3 & 8)
- Baek Jin-hee (Ep. 6, voice only)
- Ahn Hye-kyung (Ep. 6 (voice only) & 10)Alice

== Episodes ==
No.	Title	Directed by	Written by	Original release date
1	"Episode 1"	Lee Sang-yeop	Ryu Yong-jae, Kim Hwan-chae & Choi Sung-joon	February 7, 2020
2	"Episode 2"	Lee Sang-yeop	Ryu Yong-jae, Kim Hwan-chae & Choi Sung-joon	February 7, 2020
3	"Episode 3"	Lee Sang-yeop	Ryu Yong-jae, Kim Hwan-chae & Choi Sung-joon	February 7, 2020
4	"Episode 4"	Lee Sang-yeop	Ryu Yong-jae, Kim Hwan-chae & Choi Sung-joon	February 7, 2020
5	"Episode 5"	Lee Sang-yeop	Ryu Yong-jae, Kim Hwan-chae & Choi Sung-joon	February 7, 2020
6	"Episode 6"	Lee Sang-yeop & Yoon Jong-ho	Ryu Yong-jae, Kim Hwan-chae & Choi Sung-joon	February 7, 2020
7	"Episode 7"	Lee Sang-yeop & Yoon Jong-ho	Ryu Yong-jae, Kim Hwan-chae & Choi Sung-joon	February 7, 2020
8	"Episode 8"	Lee Sang-yeop & Yoon Jong-ho	Ryu Yong-jae, Kim Hwan-chae & Choi Sung-joon	February 7, 2020
9	"Episode 9"	Lee Sang-yeop & Yoon Jong-ho	Ryu Yong-jae, Kim Hwan-chae & Choi Sung-joon	February 7, 2020
10	"Episode 10"	Lee Sang-yeop & Yoon Jong-ho	Ryu Yong-jae, Kim Hwan-chae & Choi Sung-joon	February 7, 2020
11	"Episode 11"	Lee Sang-yeop & Yoon Jong-ho	Ryu Yong-jae, Kim Hwan-chae & Choi Sung-joon	February 7, 2020
12	"Episode 12"	Lee Sang-yeop & Yoon Jong-ho	Ryu Yong-jae, Kim Hwan-chae & Choi Sung-joon	February 7, 2020

== Original soundtrack ==
My Holo Love (Music from the Netflix Original Series)

Soundtrack album by Ji Pyeong-kwon
- Released: February 7, 2020
- Genre: Soundtrack
- Languages: Korean; English
- Labels: Netflix Studios; Warner Music Korea; BMG Rights Management

No.	Title	Length
1.	"Eyes on You" (Feat. Jackson Lundy)	2:38
2.	"Paradise" (Feat. Ninos)	3:35
3.	"You Are The Only One" (Feat. Elaine)	4:48
4.	"Love Again" (Feat. KLAZY)	4:18
5.	"White Clouds" (Feat. Soullette)	3:14
6.	"Shining Stars" (Feat. PlayJ)	3:48
7.	"Fly Away" (Feat. HANAJIN)	3:12
8.	"Opening Title"	0:32
9.	"Another Day"	2:13
10.	"Way Back Home"	3:45
11.	"An Ordinary Day"	2:29
12.	"Got To Know You"	2:59
13.	"On The Road"	2:44
14.	"Alone"	2:40
15.	"Car Chasing"	2:05
16.	"Holo Fantasy"	1:39
17.	"Did I Do"	1:34
18.	"When I See You"	3:41
19.	"Adore You"	2:34
20.	"Simple Things"	2:41
21.	"Truth Is"	2:04
22.	"Dream In A Dream"	2:36
23.	"Same Time"	2:07
24.	"Before You Go"	3:26
25.	"Lose Control"	3:49
26.	"Emotion"	2:01
27.	"Imperfect"	2:30
28.	"Faded"	2:43
29.	"Conflict"	3:26
30.	"Into The Light"	2:33
31.	"Stride La Vampa (from Il Trovatore)" (Feat. Shin Della)	2:45

== Production ==
Ryu Yong-jae was inspired to write the story after seeing the computer program AlphaGo beat the former professional Go player Lee Sedol during the 2016 historic match.
