= Kim Ban-jang =

Kim Ban-jang 유철상
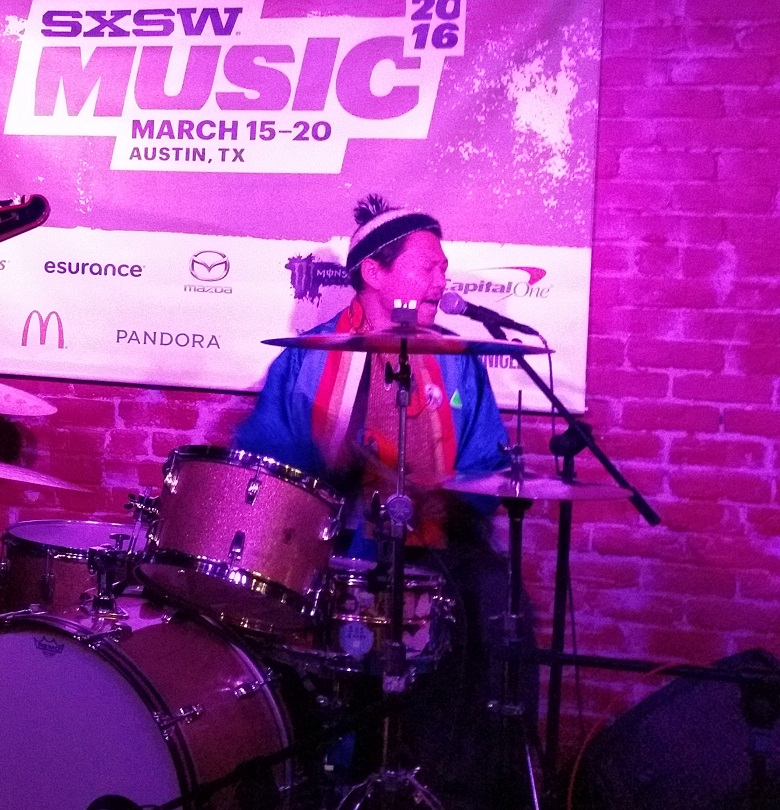
- Performing at SXSW 2016 with Windy City.

Background information
- Birth name: Yoo Cheol-sang
- Born: 28 October 1975 (age 49); South Korea
- Genres: Reggae, Soul, Korean Rock
- Occupation(s): Singer, Songwriter
- Instrument(s): Vocals, percussion, drums
- Years active: 1996–present
- Labels: Eastern Standard Sounds
- Website: www.easternstandardsounds.com

Yoo Cheol-sang (Korean: 유철상) better known by his stage name Kim Ban-jang (김반장) is a South Korean singer. He is the leader, vocal and drummer of the band Windy City. He has also been a key member of various other Korean reggae bands, including the gugak fusion band I&I Djangdan.

In May 2016, he joined the cast of variety show I Live Alone.

== Songs ==
Year	Title	Album
2014	한 이불 속 우리	한 이불 속 우리 - Single
2015	Drum	Drum - Single
2015	No More Sad-Mistake (feat. Owen Ovadoz)	No More Sad-Mistake - Single
2015	나에게 쓰는 편지	인디 20주년 기념 앨범, Pt. 4 - EP
2015	Honja Side Walk	Honja Side Walk - Single
2016	Boat Journey	Boat Journey - Single
