= Shin Ji-hoon =

South korean entertainer (born 1998)

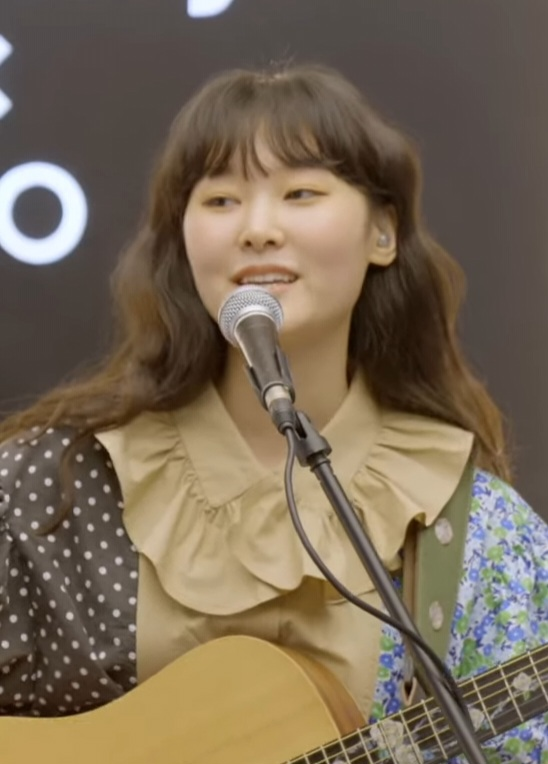
- Shin in 2021

Background information
- Born: June 23, 1998 (age 28); South Korea
- Genre: K-pop
- Occupations: Singer; figure skater; actress
- Years active: 2013–present
- Labels: Cube; Starline

Korean name
- Hangul: 신지훈
- Hanja: 辛知勳
- RR: Sin Jihun
- MR: Sin Chihun

Shin Ji-hoon (Korean: 신지훈; born June 23, 1998) is a South Korean singer, actress and figure skater. She was signed under Cube Entertainment and Starline Entertainment. She is known as TOP 6 of SBS's K-pop Star Season 2. From 2017, Shin Ji-hoon became an individual singer.

== Discography ==
=== Studio albums ===
- Stars and Memories and Poetry (별과 추억과 시; released May 1, 2022)

=== Extended plays ===
- Youth (청춘; 青春); released May 25, 2019)

=== Singles ===
| Title | Year | Peak chart positions | Album |
| Title | Year | KOR | Album |
|---|---|---|---|
| "Right There" | 2013 | 24 | Non-album singles |
| "Hurtful" (아프고 아프다) | 2013 | 33 | Non-album singles |
| "Christmas Song" (크리스마스 노래) (with Cube Entertainment artists) | 2013 | 33 | Non-album singles |
| "Small Moon" (작은 달) (with Gayoon, Yoseob, Eunkwang and Hyun-jin Ryu) | 2014 | 80 | Non-album singles |
| "Happy Ending" (해피엔딩) | 2014 | 52 | Non-album singles |
| "Crybaby" (울보) | 2014 | — | Non-album singles |
| "Jungle Gym" (정글짐) | 2016 | — | Non-album singles |
| "You Are a Star Already" (별이 안은 바다) | 2017 | — | Non-album singles |
| "Egg Flowers" (계란꽃) | 2018 | — | Youth |
| "Cherry Blossom Parade" (벚꽃 퍼레이드) | 2019 | — | Youth |
| "Youth" (파란봄) | 2019 | — | Youth |
| "From My Perspective" (나의 시점) | 2019 | — | Non-album singles |
| "Floral Wallpaper" (꽃무늬 벽지) | 2020 | — | Non-album singles |
| "A Story That Will Turn Into a Poem" (시가 될 이야기) | 2021 | — | Non-album singles |
| "When the Magnolia Blooms" (목련 필 무렵) | 2021 | — | Non-album singles |
| "You Can Say Everything" (다 말해도 돼) (with Zitten) | 2021 | — | Non-album singles |
| "Twenty-One Fifteen" (스물하나 열다섯) | 2022 | — | Stars and Memories and Poetry |
| "The Night's Window" (밤의 창가에서) | 2022 | — | Stars and Memories and Poetry |
| "A Fairy Tale" (겨울동화) | 2022 | — | Non-album singles |
| "Falling in Love is like the Spring Rain, Parting is like the Winter Rain" (사랑은 봄비처럼...이별은 겨울비처럼...) | 2023 | — | Non-album singles |
| "Longing For Love" (한 여름 사랑은 흘러가고) (with Kwon Jisoo) | 2023 | — | Non-album singles |
"—" denotes releases that did not chart.

=== Other charted songs ===
| Title | Year | Peak chart positions | Album |
| Title | Year | KOR | Album |
|---|---|---|---|
| "You Are Not Alone" | 2013 | 58 | K-pop Star 2 Top 10 |
| "Bad Thoughts" (머리가 나빠) | 2013 | 53 | The Secret of Birth OST |

== Filmography ==
=== Television ===
| Date | Title | Role | Network |
|---|---|---|---|
| Nov. 18, 2012 – Mar. 10, 2013 | Survival Audition K-pop Star Season 2 | Herself | SBS |
| May 11, 2013 | Human Documentary, I Love People | Herself | MBC |
| 2017–2018 | The Unit: Idol Rebooting Project | Herself | KBS |
| 2018 | Sweet Revenge 2 | Cho Eun-yeon | XtvN |

=== Film ===
| Year | Title | Role | Notes |
|---|---|---|---|
| 2016 | The Truth Beneath | Kim Min-jin | |

== Figure skating ==
=== Competition results ===
| Date | Event | Level | SP Score | FS Score | Total |
|---|---|---|---|---|---|
| May 8, 2010 | (South Korea) 3rd National Elementary School Trophy | 1 Degree | x | 6.0 System | 6.0 System |
| Dec. 2–4, 2010 | (South Korea) 12th Figure Skating Hopefuls Trophy | 2 Degree | x | 18.68 (25th) | 18.68 (25th) |
| Jan. 6–8, 2012 | (South Korea) 66th National Championship | Novice | 25.72 (19th) | 30.68 (44th) | 56.40 (39th) |
| Aug. 8–12, 2012 | (Taiwan) Asian Figure Skating Trophy 2012 | Basic Novice B | x | 36.17 (3rd) | 36.17 (3rd) |
| Nov. 10–11, 2012 | (South Korea) 5th Seoul Superintendent of Education Trophy | Junior School C | 22.66 (3rd) | 42.42 (2nd) | 65.08 (1st) |
| Nov. 30–Dec. 2, 2012 | (South Korea) 1st Novice Hopefuls Trophy | Novice | 26.50 (2nd) | 44.52 (3rd) | 71.02 (2nd) |
| Dec. 20–21, 2012 | (South Korea) 25th Seoul Mayor Trophy | Junior School C | 20.55 (6th) | 40.66 (2nd) | 60.21 (4th) |
| Jan. 4–6, 2013 | (South Korea) 67th National Championship | Novice | 22.70 (17th) | 44.11 (15th) | 66.81 (16th) |
| Nov. 2–3, 2013 | (South Korea) 6th Seoul Superintendent of Education Trophy | Junior School C | 23.11 (8th) | 37.75 (10th) | 60.86 (8th) |
| Dec. 18–19, 2013 | (South Korea) 26th Seoul Mayor Trophy | Junior School C | x | 35.02 (13th) | 35.02 (13th) |

=== Awards ===
| Date | Event | Level | Rank |
|---|---|---|---|
| Aug. 8–12, 2012 | (Taiwan) Asian Figure Skating Trophy 2012 | Basic Novice B | 3rd |
| Nov. 10–11, 2012 | (South Korea) 5th Seoul Superintendent of Education Trophy | Junior School C | 1st |
| Nov. 10–11, 2012 | (South Korea) Synchronized figure skating at the National Winter Games | Seoul Senior Representative (High School) Team Event | 1st |

== Other activities ==
| Date | Type | Title |
|---|---|---|
| K-pop Star Season 2 | Endorsement | KT Olleh All-IP |
