= Ji Min-hyuk =

South Korean actor

- Born: 23 September 2001 (age 25); Cheongju, South Korea
- Occupation: Actor
- Years active: 2017–present
- Height: 176 cm (5 ft 9 in)

Korean name
- Hangul: 지민혁
- RR: Ji Minhyeok
- MR: Chi Minhyŏk

Ji Min-hyuk (born 23 September 2001) is a South Korean actor.

== Filmography ==
=== Web series ===
Year	Title	Role	Ref.
2023	Duty After School	Jo Hyeong-shin	

=== Film ===
Year	Title	Role	Ref.
2018	Brothers in Heaven	Tae-sung (young)	

=== Television series ===
Year	Title	Role	Notes	Ref.
2017	Criminal Minds	young offender		
2017	Witch at Court	Yeo Jin-wook (young)		
2017	Revolutionary Love	Byun Hyuk (young)		
2017	Prison Playbook	Kang Geon-woo		
2017	A Midsummer's Memory	Park Hae-joon (young)		
2018	Return	Seo Jun-hee (young)		
2018	Tempted	Kwon Shi-hyun (young)		
2018	Sweet Revenge 2	Seo Jaeyi		
2018	100 Days My Prince	Prince Seowon		
2018	Top Star U-back	Yoo Baek (young)		
2022	KBS Drama Special – "Phone: Disappeared Memory"	Im Seong-min	One act-drama	

=== Television shows ===
Year	Title	Role
2018	High School Rapper 2	Contestant

== Awards and nominations ==
Year	Award	Category	Nominated work	Result	Ref.
2017	KBS Drama Awards	Best Young Actor	Witch at Court	Nominated	
