= The Truth Beneath =

- Theatrical release poster
- Hangul: 비밀은 없다
- RR: Bimireun eopda
- MR: Pimirŭn ŏpta
- Directed by: Lee Kyoung-mi
- Written by: Lee Kyoung-mi; Park Chan-wook; Jeong Seo-kyeong
- Produced by: Kim Yun-ho; Lee Mi-young
- Starring: Son Ye-jin; Kim Joo-hyuk
- Cinematography: Ju Sung-lim
- Edited by: Park Gok-ji
- Music by: Jang Young-gyu; Justin Bieber
- Production company: Film Train
- Distributed by: CJ Entertainment
- Release date: June 23, 2016
- Running time: 102 minutes
- Country: South Korea
- Language: Korean
- Box office: US$1.9 million

The Truth Beneath (Korean: 비밀은 없다; RR: Bimireun eopda; lit. 'There Is No Secret') is a 2016 South Korean mystery thriller film directed by Lee Kyoung-mi, her second directorial outing after 2008's Crush and Blush, and co-written by Park Chan-wook. The film stars Son Ye-jin and Kim Joo-hyuk, who previously worked together in the film My Wife Got Married.

== Plot ==
Kim Yeon-hong (Son Ye-jin) appears to have a perfect life. She is beautiful, is married to a charismatic young politician (Kim Joo-hyuk), and her adolescent daughter who used to be a troublesome child is now doing better at school. Her husband, Kim Jong-chan, decides to run for office against the powerful incumbent, No Jae-soon (Kim Eui-sung). A few days before the elections, Yeon-hong and Jong-chan's daughter, Kim Min-jin (Shin Ji-hoon), goes missing. At first, they assume she has run off to seek their attention as she had done before. However, Yeon-hong soon finds out that the friend Min-jin she said she was going to meet does not exist. Then Yeon-hong learns from the school her daughter attends that she had an eccentric friend named Choi Mi-ok (Kim So-hee) and they were both bullied by their classmates.

While questioning Mi-ok, Yeon-hong notices the girl is wearing an expensive watch that looks like her daughter's despite coming from a poor family. Yeon-hong becomes suspicious and tells this to Jong-chan. However, her husband is more preoccupied with his campaign. Yeon-hong then hacks into her daughter's email account and finds leaked examination papers sent by a young female teacher at her school. Yeon-hong knows the teacher since she once invited Jong-chan to the school as a guest speaker. The teacher eventually admits she leaked the papers but only to help Min-jin and Mi-ok improve their grades so that they can become popular to avoid getting bullied.

As the police detectives fail to find any leads, a desperate Yeon-hong goes to a shaman to find her daughter. However, it is all too late when the police finds Min-jin's dead body in the woods. A traumatized Yeon-hong blames her husband for their daughter's murder to get the city's sympathy vote since he refuses to tell the detectives where he and his driver were during the night Min-jin went missing. Despite his daughter's murder, Jong-chan is convinced by his party's president to continue his campaign.

Yeon-hong continues with her own investigation and finds an abandoned building where Min-jin and Mi-ok would practice their music. Yeon-hong convinces the police to hypnotize Mi-ok but it is not helpful. They then run a lie detector test on Mi-ok which reveals she is lying when she denies burying Min-jin's body but passes when she confesses that she did not kill her best friend. It is then revealed that Mi-ok is actually the daughter of Jong-chan's driver. Yeon-hong theorizes that Mi-ok was jealous of Min-jin for being rich and killed her out of jealousy. However, she has no evidence to prove it. Yeon-hong then breaks into Min-jin and Mi-ok's secret hideout and finds money hidden away in a bag. When Mi-ok shows up, Yeon-hong captures her and forces her to tell the truth about Min-jin's murder.

Mi-ok finally reveals that she and Min-jin became best friends after discovering they both shared the same taste in music. Min-jin then starts to suspect their teacher is having an affair. They then give the teacher a car air freshener with a hidden camera inside, which records the teacher having wild sex in her car with her secret lover. Min-jin and Mi-ok then uses the recordings to blackmail their teacher for exam papers. Since Mi-ok's family is poor, Min-jin then blackmails the teacher for money. One night, the two girls are out playing in the rain when a car runs over Min-jin while Mi-ok is hiding in the bushes. While the driver exits the car to take a photo of Min-jin's dead body, Mi-ok sneaks into the car and runs over the killer as well. She then carries Min-jin's body away and buries it in the woods after taking the contract killer's phone with her. Mi-ok is sure her teacher arranged for her and Min-jin to be killed. Yeon-hong takes the phone and is shown hatching a plan to kill the person who sent the contract killer to murder her daughter.

Later that day over dinner, Yeon-hong tells her husband that although No Jae-son most likely had nothing to do with their daughter's death, he must use the sympathy vote to win the election. Later that night, while her husband is celebrating his victory, Yeon-hong calls up the person who hired the contract killer and forces them to come to the scene of the crime or else she will leak the sex video onto the net. The person then shows up and it is not the teacher, but Jong-chan. Through flashbacks, we see that the man the teacher was having an affair with is none other than Jong-chan. After Min-jin blackmailed her teacher, the teacher told Jong-chan she is being blackmailed by two of her own students but does not tell him it is his own daughter and her best friend. Jong-chan unwittingly hired the contract killer to murder his own daughter. Yeon-hong ties her husband up and beats him in anger. She then uploads his sex video onto the internet as he watches helplessly.

== Cast ==
- Son Ye-jin as Kim Yeon-hong
- Kim Joo-hyuk as Kim Jong-chan
- Kim So-hee as Choi Mi-ok
- Shin Ji-hoon as Kim Min-jin
- Choi Yu-hwa as Son So-ra
- Kim Min-jae as Secretary-general
- Park Jin-woo as Chauffeur Choi
- Moon Young-dong as Detective Nam
- Kim Eui-sung as No Jae-soon

== Reception ==
The website, Audiences Everywhere gave the film an A, writing that it was "yet another example of why Korean cinema remains one of the most singularly original and inspired national cinemas on the planet." Asian Movie Pulse was similarly positive, praising the editing, cinematography, and Son Ye-jin’s performance for "manag[ing] to present a character of much depth in astonishing fashion, particularly regarding the extremely difficult combination of bordering on hysteria and managing to keep her wits to the fullest in order to solve the case."

== Awards and nominations ==
Award	Category	Recipient(s)	Result
Cine21 Awards	Best Film	The Truth Beneath	3rd place
25th Buil Film Awards	Best Actress	Son Ye-jin	Won
25th Buil Film Awards	Best Director	Lee Kyoung-mi	Nominated
25th Buil Film Awards	Best New Director	Lee Kyoung-mi	Nominated
36th Korean Association of Film Critics Awards	Ten Best Films of the Year	The Truth Beneath	Won
36th Korean Association of Film Critics Awards	Best Director	Lee Kyoung-mi	Won
36th Korean Association of Film Critics Awards	Best Actress	Son Ye-jin	Won
3rd Korean Film Producers Association Awards	Best Actress	Son Ye-jin	Won
17th Women in Film Korea Festival	Best Actress	Son Ye-jin	Won
17th Women in Film Korea Festival	Best Screenplay	Lee Kyoung-mi	Won
11th Paris Korean Film Festival	Audience Award	The Truth Beneath	Won
17th Busan Film Critics Awards	Best Film	The Truth Beneath	Won
17th Busan Film Critics Awards	Best Actress	Son Ye-jin	Won
22nd Chunsa Film Awards	Best Actress	Son Ye-jin	Won
22nd Chunsa Film Awards	Best Screenplay	Lee Kyoung-mi	Won
31st Fribourg International Film Festival	Grand Prix	Lee Kyoung-mi	Nominated
