= Kim Ye-eun =

South Korean actress (born 1996)

- Born: Kim Ye-eun; 16 October 1996 (age 30); South Korea
- Other name: Yeeun
- Education: Sungshin Women's University – Department of Media and Video Acting
- Occupations: Actress; model
- Years active: 2014–present
- Agent: Never Die Entertainment

Korean name
- Hangul: 김예은
- Hanja: 金睿恩
- RR: Gim Yeeun
- MR: Kim Yeŭn

Kim Ye-eun is a South Korean actress and beauty pageant titleholder. She is known for her roles in Sweet Revenge 2.

== Filmography ==
=== Film ===
Year	Title	Role	Notes	Ref.
2014	The Youth	Hye-ri's class student		
2018	Park Hwa Young	Seo-ha		
2018	Illang: The Wolf Brigade	Namsan Tower Cafe's employee		
2019	Recipe For Happiness	Rin		
2019	Goodbye Summer	Joo Hee		
2020	Oh! My Gran	Hae-eun		
2021	Summer of Thoughts	Real		
2022	Broker	Im's wife	Special appearance	
TBA	Owl			
TBA	Concrete Utopia			

=== Television series ===
Year	Title	Role	Notes	Ref.
2018	Sweet Revenge 2	Maeng Sa-rang		
2019	JTBC Drama Festa: "Recipe for Happiness"	Rin	One act-drama	
2021	Voice	Girl in Ha-eun's story	Season 4	
2021	Hometown	Kyung-ju		
2022	Eve	Yeo Ji-hee		
2023	Doctor Cha	Min Chae-yoon		

=== Web series ===
Year	Title	Role	Notes	Ref.
2019	22 Flower Road	Eun Hae Sung		
2021	Romanced	Shin Bom		
2021	Shall We Have A Cup of Coffee?			
2022	Boy's Flight	Choi Sung-kyung	Season 1–2	
2023	Race	Heo eun		

=== Hosting ===
Year	Title	Notes	Ref.
2021	17th Jecheon International Music and Film Festival Awards	with Seo Ji-hoo	
2022	27th Chunsa International Film Festival	with Ji Eun-ho	

== Awards and nominations ==
- Awarded 2016 The 86th National Chunhyang Selection Competition
