= Witch at Court =

South Korean television series

- Promotional poster
- Hangul: 마녀의 법정
- Hanja: 魔女의 法廷
- Lit.: Witch's Court
- RR: Manyeoui beopjeong
- MR: Manyŏŭi pŏpchŏng
- Genre: Legal drama; Romance
- Created by: KBS Drama Production
- Written by: Jung Do-yoon
- Directed by: Kim Young-kyun
- Starring: Jung Ryeo-won; Yoon Hyun-min
- Country of origin: South Korea
- Original language: Korean
- No. of episodes: 16

Production
- Executive producers: Ji Byung-hyun; Kim Jong-shik; Song Jae-joon
- Producers: Choi Jun-ho; Seo Byung-chul
- Camera setup: Single-camera
- Running time: 60 minutes
- Production company: iWill Media

Original release
- Network: KBS2
- Release: October 9 – November 28, 2017

Witch at Court (Korean: 마녀의 법정) is a 2017 South Korean television series starring Jung Ryeo-won and Yoon Hyun-min. An investigative law that tells the story of a snobbery prosecutor being appointed as a special prosecutor in charge of sex crimes. It aired on KBS2 from October 9 to November 28, 2017, every Monday and Tuesday at 22:00 (KST).

== Synopsis ==
This series is centered around a materialistic female prosecutor who does not hesitate to use personal attacks, fabricate evidence, and incite perjury in order to win her case is assigned to special task force for sex crimes. A newbie prosecutor also joins the task force, and together they solve crimes with a grudging chemistry.

== Cast ==
=== Main ===
- Jung Ryeo-won as Ma Yi-deum
  - Roh Jeong-eui as teen Ma Yi-deum
  - Lee Re as child Ma Yi-deum

She is an ace prosecutor with experience in all four of district prosecutors' office in Seoul. She walks a fine line between legal and illegal investigation. She does not hesitate to use personal attacks, fabricate evidence and incite perjury in order to win her case. That being said, she is egoistic and ill-tempered. In the most conservative organization in Korea, she has been struggling to rise from humble beginnings. Then she gets caught up in a case and is assigned to the special task force for child sex crimes, the most undesired team in the organization.

- Yoon Hyun-min as Yeo Jin-wook
  - Ji Min-hyuk as young Jin-wook

He is a newbie prosecutor who graduated from law school at the top of his class. He takes no interest in promotion, success and office politics. He used to be a pediatric psychiatrist, so he is able to distinguish truth and falsehood by finding the subtle nuances and hidden clues in people's testimonies, which is a useful ability for solving sex crimes, which always lack physical evidence. At first, he is not fond of Yi-deum, who pursues power without reserve, but when he learns about her painful past, he holds out his hand to her and protects her.

- Jun Kwang-ryul as Jo Gap-soo

As his father was a left-wing activist under the right-wing government, he was not able to become a prosecutor. Instead, he became a policeman. Whenever he had a chance of getting promoted, his father's record would always drag him down, so he accused innocent people as communists to show his loyalty for the government. Yet, he holds no regret or shame for the terrible things he's done. After retiring as a chief officer, he is elected as a member of the National Assembly. He is a member of the advisory board of a law firm, and he runs for the position of mayor of Yeong-pa city.

- Kim Yeo-jin as Min Ji-sook

She is the chief prosecutor of the special task force for sex crimes against children and women. She created the task force herself to help the victims more efficiently. 20 years ago, she investigated the sexual torture case of Superintendent Jo Gap-soo. She desperately wanted to punish him but failed due to lack of evidence. After 20 years, she is still fighting against Jo Gap-soo's law firm at the court.

=== Supporting ===
==== Department for Women's Crime Division ====
- Jun Ik-ryung as Jang Eun-jung
- Choi Ri as Seo Yoo-ri
- Kim Jae-hwa as Son Mi-young
- Yoon Kyung-ho as Goo Seok-chan

==== Brother Law Firm ====
- Heo Sung-tae as Baek Sang-ho
- Kim Min-seo as Heo Yoon-kyung, an ace lawyer who does anything to win
- Go On as Ahn Tae-kyu

==== Others ====
- Lee Il-hwa as Kwak Young-sil, Yi-deum's mother
- Song Chae-yoon as Jang Yoo-mi
- Jo Woo-ri as Jin Yeon-hee
- Kang Kyung-hun as Sun Hye-young
- Park Doo-shik as Kim Dong-shik
- Jung In-seo as Yoon Ah-reum
- Kim Kwon as Baek Min-ho
- Kim Ji-eun as Chairman Ahn's secretary
- Im Kang-sung as Yoon Min-joo
- Jeon Bae-soo as Oh Soo-cheol
- Jung Jae-kwang as Prosecutor Yun

== Production ==
- The series is formerly known as Don't Trust Her (그녀를 믿지 마세요; Geunyeoreul mitji maseyo).
- Filming started in early September 2017.
- The series is produced by iWill Media, of which founder and CEO Kim Jong-shik is a former drama production director for KBS.

== Ratings ==
Ep.	Original broadcast date	Average audience share			
Ep.	Original broadcast date	TNmS		Nielsen Korea	
Ep.	Original broadcast date	Nationwide	Seoul	Nationwide	Seoul
1	October 9, 2017	6.5% (NR)	6.9% (NR)	6.6% (NR)	7.0% (NR)
2	October 10, 2017	7.6% (17th)	7.8% (13th)	9.5% (9th)	9.6% (9th)
3	October 16, 2017	8.1% (18th)	9.0% (11th)	9.1% (9th)	8.6% (9th)
4	October 17, 2017	10.9% (8th)	10.4% (7th)	12.3% (5th)	12.7% (3rd)
5	October 23, 2017	8.5% (14th)	9.4% (9th)	10.2% (8th)	10.6% (6th)
6	October 24, 2017	9.6% (11th)	10.8% (5th)	11.0% (6th)	11.3% (4th)
7	October 30, 2017	7.5% (18th)	7.8% (15th)	7.6% (16th)	7.7% (14th)
8	October 31, 2017	9.4% (13th)	10.6% (5th)	9.3% (8th)	9.1% (7th)
9	November 6, 2017	8.7% (13th)	9.1% (10th)	10.1% (7th)	10.3% (9th)
10	November 7, 2017	11.1% (7th)	12.4% (5th)	11.4% (6th)	11.9% (5th)
11	November 13, 2017	9.3% (10th)	10.8% (6th)	10.5% (7th)	10.5% (9th)
12	November 14, 2017	11.2% (7th)	12.3% (5th)	11.9% (7th)	12.3% (3rd)
13	November 20, 2017	9.4% (9th)	9.8% (6th)	10.9% (7th)	10.6% (8th)
14	November 21, 2017	11.9% (6th)	12.0% (6th)	12.6% (6th)	12.3% (4th)
15	November 27, 2017	9.9% (12th)	10.2% (5th)	11.9% (4th)	11.9% (6th)
16	November 28, 2017	12.0% (5th)	12.6% (4th)	14.3% (4th)	14.1% (3rd)
Average		9.5%	10.1%	10.6%	10.6%
In the table above, the blue numbers represent the lowest ratings and the red numbers represent the highest ratings.; NR denotes that the drama did not rank in the top 20 daily programs on that date.

== Awards and nominations ==
Year	Award	Category	Nominee	Result	Ref.
2017	31st KBS Drama Awards	Top Excellence Award, Actress	Jung Ryeo-won	Won	
2017	31st KBS Drama Awards	Excellence Award, Actress in a Miniseries	Jung Ryeo-won	Nominated	
2017	31st KBS Drama Awards	Excellence Award, Actor in a Miniseries	Yoon Hyun-min	Nominated	
2017	31st KBS Drama Awards	Best Supporting Actress	Lee Il-hwa	Won	
2017	31st KBS Drama Awards	Best Supporting Actress	Kim Yeo-jin	Nominated	
2017	31st KBS Drama Awards	Best Young Actor	Ji Min-hyuk	Nominated	
2017	31st KBS Drama Awards	Best Young Actress	Lee Re	Won	
2017	31st KBS Drama Awards	Best Couple Award	Jung Ryeo-won and Yoon Hyun-min	Won	
2018	6th APAN Star Awards	Top Excellence Award, Actress in a Miniseries	Jung Ryeo-won	Nominated	
