= Tunnel (TV series) =

2017 South Korean television series

- Promotional poster
- Genre: Thriller; Crime
- Created by: Studio Dragon; Choi Jin-hee
- Written by: Lee Eun-mi
- Directed by: Shin Yong-hwi
- Starring: Choi Jin-hyuk; Yoon Hyun-min; Lee Yoo-young
- Music by: Kim Joon-seok
- Opening theme: "The Leopard of Mt. Kilimanjaro" (킬리만자로의 표범) – Cho Yong-pil
- Country of origin: South Korea
- Original language: Korean
- No. of episodes: 16

Production
- Executive producers: Choi Kyung-sook; Kim Jin-yi
- Producers: Kim Sung-min; Park Ji-young
- Cinematography: Choi Sung-ho; Yoo Hyuk-joon
- Editor: Yoo Sung-yeop
- Running time: 65 minutes
- Production company: The Unicorn

Original release
- Network: OCN
- Release: March 25 – May 21, 2017

Tunnel (Korean: 터널) is a 2017 South Korean television series starring Choi Jin-hyuk, Yoon Hyun-min and Lee Yoo-young. It replaced Voice and aired on cable network OCN on Saturdays and Sundays at 22:00 (KST) from March 25 to May 21, 2017 for 16 episodes. The series was inspired by the Hwaseong serial murders.

The series was a hit in China. It received a Thai remake in 2019, and an Indonesian remake was announced in 2020.

== Synopsis ==
In 1986, Park Gwang-ho works as a successful detective in an enthusiastic manner. However, his life changes when he takes the lead in a serial homicide case and passes through a tunnel while chasing the "culprit". He time travels 30 years into the future (2016), where he meets a new partner, Kim Seon-jae, an eccentric elite detective that has a high ability in investigation. When the serial killer continues the "modus operandi" of his murders that happened 30 years ago, the detective duo work together with criminal psychologist, Professor Shin Jae-yi, to solve the unsolved murders and to catch the murderer.

== Cast ==
=== Main ===
- Choi Jin-hyuk as Park Gwang-ho

Hwayang police station's criminal sergeant detective who mysteriously disappears in 1986 and appears in 2016.

- Yoon Hyun-min as Kim Seon-jae
  - Kim Seul-woo as child Seon-jae

Hwayang police station's elite criminal lieutenant detective in 2016.

- Lee Yoo-young as Shin Jae-yi
  - Kim Se-hee as Park Yeon-ho (Jae-yi's name in the childhood)
  - Lee Da-kyung as teenage Jae-yi

Park Gwang-ho and Shin Yeon-sook's only daughter. University professor and criminal psychological counselor in 2016.

=== Supporting ===
==== Criminal Team 1 ====
- Jo Hee-bong as Jeon Sung-sik
  - Kim Dong-young as young Jeon Sung-sik

Hwayang police station's criminal team 1 leader in 2016, previously a criminal corporal detective and the youngest of his team in 1986.

- Kim Byung-chul as criminal detective Kwak Tae-hee
- Kang Ki-young as criminal detective Song Min-ha

==== Extended ====
- Lee Si-a as Shin Yeon-sook

Park Gwang-ho's wife in 1986. She died in a car accident in 1991.

- Kim Min-sang as Mok Jin-woo
  - Choi Seung-hoon as child Jin-woo
  - No Tae-yeop as teenage Jin-woo (Ep. 12)

Hwayang University's Faculty of Medicine forensic doctor in 2016. He is the real culprit of the mysterious 1986 Hwayang serial killings.

- Yang Joo-ho as reporter Oh / Oh Ji-hoon

Reporter Oh who often searched for information at Hwayang police station in 1986; now a taxi driver in 2016 who wants to become a police officer named Oh Ji-hoon.

- Cha Hak-yeon as Park Gwang-ho

Criminal corporal police in 2016 with three years of experience, also named Park Gwang-ho but born in 1988. The youngest of team 1, but has been missing since the first day of transferring work, and gets entangled in an unexplained pursuit leading to his death.

- Nam Moon-cheol as leader Oh

Hwayang police station's criminal department leader in 1986.

- Moon Sook as Hong Hye-won

Psychologist and the president of Hwayang University in 2016.

- Yoo Ji-soo as Lee Nan-young, Kim Seon-jae's stepmother (Ep. 5, 7, 8)

=== Case characters ===
==== Women Mass Murder Case at Hwayang in 1985–1986 (Ep. 1-3) ====
- Heo Sung-tae as Jung Ho-young
  - Ham Sung-min as young Jung Ho-young
- N/A as Lee Jeong-sook

First victim, her corpse was discovered in a field.

- N/A as Kim Kyung-soon

High school student and the second victim, her corpse was discovered at Haein riverside.

- Han Yeo-wool as Hwang Choon-hee

Rose cafe's staff and the third victim. Her corpse was discovered at the reeds area near Sungyoo mountain.

- Seok Bo-bae as Seo Yi-soo

Kim Wan's wife and Kim Seon-jae's mother. She was the fourth victim who was killed on her way back home, on the bare ground near the military base.

- Kim Jeong-hak as Kim Wan

Seo Yi-soo's husband and Kim Seon-jae's father. He was a military officer in 1986.

- Kim Hye-yoon as young Kim Young-ja

The fifth victim but still alive at this time, changed her name to Kim Jeong-hye.

- N/A as Jin Seon-mi

The sixth victim who was killed in a tunnel, which is the beginning of Park Gwang-ho's disappearance after he meets the perpetrator again.

==== Suicide at Hwayang Psychiatric Hospital (former Hwayang Chapel) in 2016 (Ep. 2) ====
- Park Myung-shin as Lee Seon-ok
  - Shin Na-ae as Lee Seon-ok in 1986

Victim. Mental patient in 2016, previously a murder suspect in 1986 and captured in 1990 after three murders.

==== Kim Jeong-hye's Murder Case in 2016 (Ep. 2–3) ====
- Jo Shi-nae as Kim Jeong-hye

Victim of this case, previously named Kim Young-ja. (see the case above)

- Song Young-jae as Kim Tae-soo

Murder perpetrator. He had feelings for the victim, but it wasn't reciprocated because of his fake hand.

- Ryoo Tae-ho as Jang Young-cheol, victim's ex-husband
- Kim Choo-wol as hostess of Ho motel, where the victim had been staying.
- Choi Min-geum as Jang Young-cheol, motel owner
- Sung Hyun-mi as the owner of a restaurant where the victim often came to eat alone.

==== Local House Robbery and Yoon Dong-woo's Murder Case in 2016 (Ep. 4) ====
- Choi Won-hong as Yoon Dong-woo
- Choi Myung-bin as Yoon Soo-jeong, Dong-woo's younger sister
- Jeon Jae-hyung as Noh Young-jin

SAFE security company's former employee who was fired for theft, one of the robbers of the local houses protected by SAFE who was arrested at the scene, and who stabbed Dong-woo with the first knife.

- Jung Soon-won as Young-jin's co-robber, who was also arrested at the scene and who stabbed Dong-woo with a second knife.

==== Choi Hong-seok's Murder Case (Ep. 5) ====
- Jeon Jin-gi as Kim In-hwan (58-year-old)

Teacher and the perpetrator. His son, Kim Ji-hoon, was killed by Choi Hong-seok in the military enlistment.

- Hong Boo-hyang as Ji-hoon's mother
- Woo Hyun as Go Man-seok, 48-year-old rest stop owner
- Im Kang-sung as Ma Young-gil, 30-year-old professional baseball player
- Jin Yong-wook as Lee Dae-hwan, 27-year-old former prisoner and tow truck driver
- Lee Dong-jin as Hwang Do-kyung, 27-year-old and Ministry of Strategy and Finance's IT Officer's secretary

==== Impersonation and Jo Dong-ik's Murder Case (Ep. 6) ====
- Seo Eun-ah as Kim Mi-soo, perpetrator
- Jung Han-bi as Yoon Young-joo, victim
- Kim Min-kyung as victim Go Ah-ra's mother
- Yoo Jang-young as Mi-soo's ex-boyfriend

==== Seon-Hwa Dressmaking Shop's Fire Case (Ep. 8) ====
- Ahn Yong-joon as Kim Hee-joon, perpetrator
- Yoon Mi-hyang as Seon-Hwa, dressmaking shop's owner
- Park So-jeong as Sook-jin, shop owner opposite Seon-Hwa's shop, and Hee-joon's mother

==== Chain Murder Case (Ep. 7, 9–16) ====
- Lee Yong-nyeo as Yoo Ok-hee, Jung Ho-young's old mother (Ep. 9)

=== Others ===
- Hong Gi-joon as Hwayang Police Station's detective in 1986
- Kang Seok-won as Hwayang Police Station's detective in 1986
- Choi Jae-hyuk
- Han Sang-gil
- Jung Dong-hoon
- Jung Young-geum
- Jung Mi-hye
- Lee Jin-mok
- Han Sang-woo
- Hyun Jeong-cheol
- Dang Hyun-seok
- Kim In-ho
- Go Bong-goo
- Jo Jeong-hoon
- Kang Ji-hoon
- Lee Kang-young
- Park Se-joon
- Jung Dae-yong
- Kim Min-sung
- Kwak Min-gyu
- Kim Jong-ho
- Gong Soo-min as the older sister between two children who lost a puppy (Ep. 1)
- Kim Ji-an as the younger sister between two children who lost a puppy (Ep. 1)
- Kim Tae-young
- Lee Soo-yeon as Seo Jeong-eun, daughter of Lee Seon-ok's victim (Ep. 2)
- Lee Jae-eun as Park Gwang-ho and Shin Jae-yi's house owner (Ep. 2)
- Park Jong-bo
- Lee Beom-chan
- Jang Won-jin
- Yoo Kyung-hoon
- Kim Ki-beom
- Lee Seon-young
- Shim Sang-woo
- Kim Eun-hae
- Kim Yoo-jin
- Yoon Seo-jeong
- Jin Jeong-gwan
- Yoo Jae-ik
- Park Eun-young
- Lee Joo-young
- Kim Young-hee
- Lee Jae-eun as the woman is eating with two children in the restaurant (Ep. 4)
- Park Jin-sung
- Shin Tae-hyun
- Choi Hye-jeong
- Yoo Kyung-hoon
- Park In-jeong
- Park Ok-chool
- Jo Yong-sang
- Oh Sang-hwa
- Kim Sang-il
- Jung Tae-ya
- Choi Hyun-joon
- Lee Do-gyeom
- Cha Jae-man
- Choi Young-min
- Kwon Ban-seok as detective, Kim Seon-jae's former partner who lost Jung Ho-young at the police station (Ep. 5)
- Uhm Ok-ran
- Kim Do-hyung
- Choi Na-moo
- Kim Nam-hee
- Lee Dong-gyu
- Jo Hyun-jin
- Park Dae-gyu as Choi Hong-seok's military enlistment teammate (Ep. 5)
- Park Ik-joon
- Kim Jong-doo
- Kwon Jin-ran
- Kang Hak-soo
- Son In-yong
- Kim Kyung-min
- Min Hyo-kyung
- Jung Hee-young
- Jung Hee-jong
- Seo Jeong-joon
- Choi Young
- Shin Yool-yi
- Jin Myung-seon
- Kim Hyun
- Jang Hyo-min
- Han Hye-mi
- Choi Da-young
- Kim Beo-deul
- Park Sung-min
- Lee Jeong-joo
- Kim Nam-hee
- Park Ji-yeon
- Nam Jeong-hee as Gwang-ho (born 1988)'s old hometown neighborhood woman (Ep. 6)
- Park Seung-tae as Gwang-ho (born 1988)'s old hometown neighborhood woman (Ep. 6)
- Seo Woo-jin
- Baek In-kwon
- Kim Jin-woo
- Seo Dong-gyu
- Lee Seung-yeon as Jin Sung-cheol, younger brother of Jin Seon-mi (Jung Ho-young's sixth victim in 1986) (Ep. 6)
- Seo Young-sam
- Ha Min
- Kim Nam-hee as Yoon-hui
- Ahn Soo-bin
- Joo Hye-min
- Yoo Yong-beom
- Ji Sung-geun as shopping guy (Ep. 8)
- Choi Gyo-sik as Oh Young-dal, cellphone shop owner (Ep. 8)
- Kim Bi-bi
- Jeon Byung-deok
- Heo Seon-haeng as man in the shopping store (Ep. 8)
- Oh Seung-hee
- Shin Yeon-sook as old woman in Mooyoung Clinic (Ep. 8)
- Min Dae-sik
- Park Cheol-min
- Jo Seung-yeon as Hwayang police station's department head (Ep. 9)
- Park Sang-yong
- Jo Sung-yoon
- Nam Sang-baek
- Jo Huin-dol
- Jeon Jae-hyun
- Im Sung-pyo as Hwayang police station chief in 2016 (Ep. 9)
- Baek Hyun-joo as Jung Ho-young's older sister-in-law (Ep. 9)
- Yoo Min-ja as Jung Ho-young's mother-in-law (Ep. 9)
- Kim Young-seon as Jung Ho-young's psychiatrist in 1987 (Ep. 9)
- Yoon Jin-sol as Haein river victim Yoon Da-young's friend (Ep. 9)
- Oh Hyo-jin
- Kim Kwang-tae
- Park Jae-won
- Baek Seung-ah
- Ok Joo-ri as Jung Ho-young's younger sister Jung Hye-ji's neighbor (Ep. 10)
- Hong Hee-ra
- So Joon-hyung
- Han Ji-ho
- Ahn Jang-hoon
- Lee Taek-geun
- Won Seo-ho
- Lee Eun-seok
- Kim Sung-yeon
- Kim Jeong-min
- Park Jin-soo
- Hong Seok-yeon as Shin-Hae Chemical's former employee (Ep. 12)
- Kang Woon
- Yoo Byung-seon as Hwayang police station's criminal team 2's detective Kim (Ep. 12)
- Jang Hyun-jeong
- Yoon Hyo-jin
- Moon Gi-young
- Lee Hyun-eung
- Jo Hyun-geon
- Lee Ja-ryung
- Lee Soo-ja
- Choi Jeong-ja
- Noh Tae-young
- Jo Min-jae
- Son Young-soon
- Cha Do-yeon
- Kang Yoon-jeong
- Yoon Boo-jin
- Kim Jae-cheol
- Go Tae-young
- Kim Moon-ho
- Han Seung-hyun
- Ryoo Jeong
- Park Yong-jin as father of Kim Kyung-soon (Jung Ho-young's second victim) (Ep. 16)
- Lee Young-hee as mother of Lee Jeong-sook (Jung Ho-young's first victim) (Ep. 16)
- Kim Doo-hee
- Yoo Chang-sook as mother of Hwang Choon-hee (Jung Ho-young's third victim) (Ep. 16)
- Kim Won-joong
- Yoo Young-bok

=== Special appearances ===
- Jung Seok-yong as Kim Jong-doo, forensic doctor of Hwayang Public Health Center in 1986 (Ep. 1)
- Oh Yoon-hong as Madam Jung, owner of Rose café located in front of the police station in 1986 (Ep. 1)
- Kwak In-joon as Hwayang police station chief in 1986 (Ep. 1)
- Jung Yi-rang as Lee Geum-soon (Ep. 3)
- Na Jae-geun as priest in the church when Jung Ho-young comes to confess after killing the seventh woman in 2016 (Ep. 4)
- Choi Il-hwa as Yoo Sung-jae, a pharmacist who loved Yeon-sook after Gwang-ho was believed to be dead in 1986 (Ep. 8)
- Park Jeong-hak as senior police officer (Ep. 9)
- Song Jae-ryong as Kim Kyung-tae (Ep. 12)
- Kim Ji-sung as Hwayang police station's criminal team 2's leader (Ep. 15)
- Seo Yoon-ah as Park Kwang-ho (born 1988)'s mother (Ep. 16)

== Original soundtrack ==
No.	Title	Artist	Length
1.	"Circle of Life (세상은 다시)"	JK Kim Dong-wook	3:59
2.	"Circle of Life (세상은 다시)" (Inst.)		3:59
Total length:			7:58

== Ratings ==
In this table, the blue numbers represent the lowest ratings and the red numbers represent the highest ratings.

Ep.	Original broadcast date	Average audience share		
Ep.	Original broadcast date	AGB Nielsen		TNmS
Ep.	Original broadcast date	Nationwide	Seoul	Nationwide
1	March 25, 2017	2.760%	2.900%	2.9%
2	March 26, 2017	3.131%	3.268%	3.2%
3	April 1, 2017	4.228%	4.689%	4.1%
4	April 2, 2017	3.555%	3.293%	4.3%
5	April 8, 2017	3.522%	3.733%	3.6%
6	April 9, 2017	4.042%	3.922%	3.3%
7	April 15, 2017	3.863%	3.951%	4.1%
8	April 16, 2017	5.179%	5.100%	4.9%
9	April 22, 2017	4.700%	4.942%	4.3%
10	April 23, 2017	5.413%	5.536%	5.4%
11	April 29, 2017	4.921%	4.967%	4.4%
12	April 30, 2017	5.375%	5.480%	5.1%
13	May 13, 2017	5.491%	5.779%	4.9%
14	May 14, 2017	6.263%	6.901%	4.9%
15	May 20, 2017	5.843%	6.510%	5.4%
16	May 21, 2017	6.490%	7.057%	6.0%
Average		4.674%	4.877%	4.4%

- This drama airs on a cable channel/pay TV which normally has a relatively smaller audience compared to free-to-air TV/public broadcasters (KBS, SBS, MBC and EBS).
- Due to South Korean presidential election on May 9, 2017, the episodes 13 and 14 were canceled to air on May 6 and 7. Those episodes were broadcast on May 13 and 14.

== Remake ==
The series remade into Thai language with the same title in 2019.

An Indonesian adaptation starring Donny Alamsyah and Hana Malasan, and directed by Ifa Isfansyah as one of the three directors assigned to direct different episodes. Tanya Yuson and Shanty Harmayn served as the showrunners, while Fourcolors Films produced the show.
