= Yang Dae-hyuk =

South Korean actor

- Born: 16 April 1987 (age 39); Chungcheong, South Korea
- Other name: Yang Dae-hyoek
- Education: Dankook University
- Occupation: Actor
- Years active: 2013–present
- Agent: Beasts Entertainment
- Known for: The Third Charm; My Holo Love; Three Bold Siblings

Yang Dae-hyuk is a South Korean actor. He is known for his roles in dramas such as The Third Charm, My Holo Love, 18 Again, Sweet Munchies and Three Bold Siblings.

== Filmography ==
=== Television series ===
Year	Title	Role	Ref.
2015	House of Bluebird	Waiter	
2016	Signal	Hong Won-seo	
2016	The Gentlemen of Wolgyesu Tailor Shop	Yoo Dae-ri	
2017	Moonlight Sonata	Nah Sung-joon	
2017	Sisters-in-Law	Jang Hyun-soo	
2017	The Package	Staff, Lohas Finance Education Center	
2017	Go Back	Senior of History Department	
2017	Prison Playbook	Corporal Choi	
2017	Smashing on Your Back	Hospital Nurse	
2018	Misty	Floor director	
2018	Short	Skater	
2018	The Third Charm	Joo Kwang-ho	
2019	Doctor Prisoner	Kang Sun-woo	
2019	KBS Drama Special – "Hidden"	Song Jae-ho	
2020	My Holo Love	Lee Dong-shik	
2020	Welcome	Cha Sang-kwon	
2020	Mystic Pop-up Bar	Bad customer at Gapeul Mart	
2020	Sweet Munchies	Nam Gyu-jang	
2020	18 Again	Nam Gi-tae	
2020	Start-Up	Choi Yang-won	
2020	Lovestruck in the City	Yoon Byung-soo	
2021	Bad and Crazy	Park Seong-gwan	
2022	Three Bold Siblings	Jo Nam-soo	
2024	Beauty and Mr. Romantic	Park Do-sik	
2024	The Trunk	Oh Jin-bum	

=== Film ===
Year	Title	Role
2013	Sleepless Night	Priest
2018	Home	Soccer Coach
2019	Ashfall	Agent
