= Sweet Revenge 2 =

2018 South Korean television series

- Promotional poster
- Hangul: 복수노트 2
- Lit.: Revenge Note 2
- RR: Boksunoteu 2
- MR: Poksunot'ŭ 2
- Genre: Coming of age Revenge
- Created by: Rhee Myung-han
- Written by: Han Sang-im; Kim Jong-seon; Shim Min-sun
- Directed by: Oh Seung-yeol; Seo Jae-joo
- Starring: Ahn Seo-hyun; Samuel Kim; Ji Min-hyuk; Kim Ye-eun
- Country of origin: South Korea
- Original language: Korean
- No. of episodes: 16

Production
- Executive producer: Lee Jae-moon
- Camera setup: Single-camera
- Running time: 60 minutes
- Production company: Hidden Sequence

Original release
- Network: tvN
- Release: August 13 – October 9, 2018

Related
- Sweet Revenge

Sweet Revenge 2 (Korean: 복수노트 2; RR: Boksunoteu 2) is a South Korean television series starring Ahn Seo-hyun, Samuel Kim, and Ji Min-hyuk. It is the sequel to the 2017 streaming television series Sweet Revenge which drew 11 million combined views. It aired on xtvN's Mondays and Tuesdays at 20:00 (KST) from August 13 to October 9, 2018. Grim from The Grim Adventures of Billy and Mandy appears on the Revenge phone app this time as the background for it.

== Synopsis ==
Oh Ji-na is a 17-year-old high school student who discovers a mysterious mobile application that executes revenge whenever someone's name is typed into it.

== Cast ==
=== Main ===
- Ahn Seo-hyun as Oh Ji-na
- Samuel Kim as Seo Robin
- Ji Min-hyuk as Seo Jaeyi

=== Supporting ===
- Kim Ji-young as Oh Sa-na, Ji-na's younger sister
- Park Hee-jin as Kim Eun-hee, Ji-na and Sa-na's mother
- Seo Yu-ri as Kim Seon-hee, Ji-na and Sa-na's aunt
- Sung Ji-ru as Oh Kang-dong, Ji-na and Sa-na's father
- Kim Ye-eun as Maeng Sa-rang
- Hwang Tae-kwang as Robin and Jaeyi's father
- Song Soo-hyun as Bae Shin-ae, Ji-na’s best friend
- Kim So-hee as Geum Soo-ji
- Shin Ji-hoon as Cho Eun-yeon
- Park Ji-hu as Lee Ha-yan
- Park Seo-yeon as Jeong Bo-ra
- Jo Jung-eun as Park Saem-na

=== Special appearances ===
- Shin Bong-sun as Herself
- Kwon Mina as Herself
- Jo Jae-yoon as Ha Rok-hee's father

== Original soundtrack ==
Sweet Revenge 2 OST

Soundtrack album by Various artists
- Released: 2018
- Genre: Soundtrack
- Languages: Korean; English
- Labels: Hidden Sequence; Vlending Co.; Movie Closer; Music Life Company

=== Part 1 ===
Released on August 27, 2018
| No. | Title | Lyrics | Music | Artist | Length |
|---|---|---|---|---|---|
| 1. | "Kiss Kiss" | Maboos | Maboos, JS | Jude (Big Star) | 3:22 |
| Total length: | | | | | 3:22 |

=== Part 2 ===
Released on September 3, 2018
| No. | Title | Lyrics | Music | Artist | Length |
|---|---|---|---|---|---|
| 1. | "Time to Shine" | Maboos, Feeldog (Big Star) | Maboos, JS | Feeldog (Big Star), Samuel | 3:33 |
| Total length: | | | | | 3:33 |

=== Part 3 ===
Released on October 1, 2018
| No. | Title | Lyrics | Music | Artist | Length |
|---|---|---|---|---|---|
| 1. | "Only I Don't Know" (나만 모르게) | Kim Ji-ae | Jeon Se-jin | Hwang Ye-rin | 4:06 |
| 2. | "Rise Up" | Ji Min-hyuk, Jay Fox | Jay Fox | Ji Min-hyuk, Kim Yoo-jung | 2:46 |
| Total length: | | | | | 6:52 |

== Episodes ==
| No. | Title | Original release date |
|---|---|---|
| 1 | "Episode 1" | August 13, 2018 |
| 2 | "Episode 2" | August 14, 2018 |
| 3 | "Episode 3" | August 20, 2018 |
| 4 | "Episode 4" | August 21, 2018 |
| 5 | "Episode 5" | August 27, 2018 |
| 6 | "Episode 6" | August 28, 2018 |
| 7 | "Episode 7" | September 3, 2018 |
| 8 | "Episode 8" | September 4, 2018 |
| 9 | "Episode 9" | September 10, 2018 |
| 10 | "Episode 10" | September 11, 2018 |
| 11 | "Episode 11" | September 17, 2018 |
| 12 | "Episode 12" | September 18, 2018 |
| 13 | "Episode 13" | October 1, 2018 |
| 14 | "Episode 14" | October 2, 2018 |
| 15 | "Episode 15" | October 8, 2018 |
| 16 | "Episode 16" | October 9, 2018 |

- Episodes 13 and 14 did not air on September 24 and 25 respectively due to Chuseok.
