= Fabien Yoon =

French entertainer and taekwondoin (born 1987)

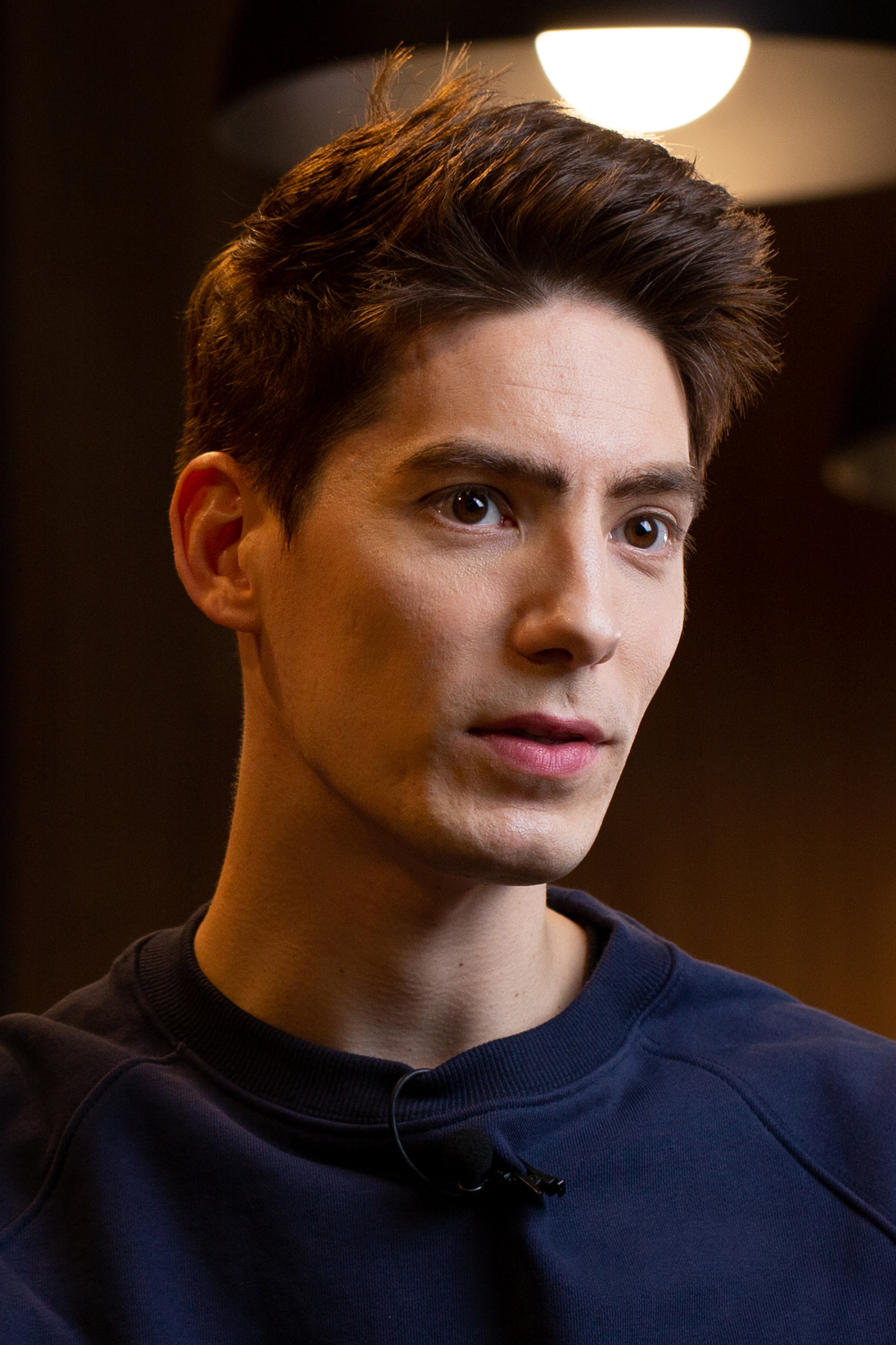
- Fabien in November 2020
- Born: Fabien Yves Jérôme Corbineau; October 30, 1987 (age 38); Paris, France
- Other names: Fabien, Choi Yoon
- Education: Paris-East Créteil University
- Occupations: Model, actor, taekwondoin

Fabien Yves Jérôme Corbineau (French pronunciation: [fabjɛ̃ iv ʒeʁom kɔʁbino]; born October 30, 1987), professionally known as Fabien Yoon (Korean: 파비앙 윤) or just Fabien, is a French model, actor, author and taekwondo practionner based in Seoul, South Korea. He was a member of the popular variety show I Live Alone. He was briefly part of the French taekwondo national team but had to quit due to injuries sustained in a competition.

In 2016, Fabien put out a French-language book about South Korean cuisine titled "La Cuisine Coréenne de Fabien Yoon" to promote South Korean culinary arts and techniques in his home country.

He speaks French, English, Korean, Japanese and Spanish and knows a smattering of Arabic and Italian.

== Filmography ==
=== Drama and sitcom ===
- Rookie Historian Goo Hae-ryung (MBC, 2019) - Jean Baptiste Barthélemy and Dominique Barthélemy
- Mister Sunshine (tvN, 2018) - Leo
- Joseon Kingdom Annals Talk (tvN, 2018) - Welteveree
- Oh! Halmae (KBS1, 2015) - Chelsu
- Hi! School: Love On (KBS2, 2014) - Philip
- Goddess of Marriage (SBS, 2013)
- Missing You (MBC, 2012)
- The King 2 Hearts (MBC, 2012) - Charly
- Dr. Jin (MBC, 2012) - Ridel
- I Live in Cheongdam-dong (JTBC, 2012)
- Come, Come, Absolutely Come (MBN, 2012)
- Lie to Me (SBS, 2011)
- Queen of Reversals (MBC, 2010)
- Secret Garden (SBS, 2010)
- Jejungwon (SBS, 2010) - Evison
- East of Eden (MBC, 2008)

=== Movies ===
- Fashion King (2014) - Fabien (Himself)
- Papa (2011) - Jimmy

=== TV Show ===
- My Neighbor Charles (KBS1, since 2016)
- The east sea expedition (Arirang TV, 2016)
- Bring it On (Arirang TV, 2015)
- Glimpse of Korea (Arirang TV, 2015)
- My Little Kitchen (Arirang TV, 2015)
- Woori mal Battle (KBS1, 2015, 2016)
- Happy Together Season 3 (KBS2, 2015)
- Best Ramyun (MBC Every1, 2014)
- Hi! Stranger (MBC, 2014)
- Emergency Escape Number 1 (KBS2, 2014)
- SNL Korea Season 5 (tvN, 2014)
- Quiz Show The Four Musketeers (KBS2, 2014)
- Whatta! Bubble gum Championship season 3 (One Game Net, 2014)
- Queen of the Closet (QTV, 2014)
- Star Flower (MBC, 2014)
- Vitamin (KBS2, 2014)
- Hello Counselor (KBS2, 2014)
- Running Man (SBS, 2014, 2015)
- Happy Together 3 (KBS2, 2014)
- Cool Kiz On The Block (KBS2, 2014)
- True Live Show (Story on, 2014)
- Modoo Marble Tournament (On Game Net, 2014년)
- Share TV - Like! (tvN, 2014)
- Three Wheels (MBC, 2014)
- I live alone (MBC, 2014)
- Stylog (On Style, 2013)
- Let's Go! Dream Team Season 2 (KBS2, 2013)
- Nori Wang (KBS2, 2013)
- From Start Till Clear (On Game Net, 2012)
- Olive Show 2012 (Olive, 2012)
- YOU CAN COOK (Olive, 2012)
- Korea's Next Top Model Season 3 (On Style, 2012)
- The Birth of The RIch (tvN, 2011)
- Happy Train (MBC, 2011)
- Yeo Yoo Man Man (KBS2, 2011)
- Gag Concert (KBS2, 2011)
- Martian Virus (tvN, 2011)
- Get it Beauty 2011 (On Style, 2011)
- Count Down Reality 48H! (Channel View, 2010)
- Section TV (MBC, 2010)
- Survival Hanshik King (KBS2, 2009)
- Woein Gudan (MBC, 2009)

=== Theater Play- Stage ===
- Acoustic Love (2011)
- Blind Season 2 (2010) - Sternberg

=== Music Video ===
- NIA - Goodbye (2010)
- Seo Inyoung - Let's Break up (2013)

=== TV CF ===
2014 Kiturami 2014년 KT Telecom 2013년 Samsung - Galaxy S4 2012년 Fanta 2011년 GENIA 4 2009년 Kyochon Chicken
