= Beating Again =

2015 South Korean romance - comedy television series

- Promotional poster
- Also known as: Falling in Love with Soon-jung; Falling for Innocence
- Genre: Romance; Comedy; Drama
- Written by: Yoo Hee-kyung
- Directed by: Ji Young-soo
- Starring: Jung Kyung-ho; Kim So-yeon; Yoon Hyun-min
- Composer: Kim Joon-seok
- Country of origin: South Korea
- Original language: Korean
- No. of episodes: 16

Production
- Executive producers: Son Ki-won; Kim Woon-ho; Jo Joon-hyeon
- Producers: Ra Ha-na; Yeon Ju-hyeong; Jo Gwang-hwi
- Production location: Korea
- Cinematography: Choi Jin-tae; Jung Hae-geun
- Editors: Kim Soo-jin; Jeon Hyun-jung
- Running time: 57 – 61 minutes
- Production companies: Kim Jong-hak Production; Doremi Entertainment

Original release
- Network: jTBC
- Release: April 3 – May 23, 2015

Beating Again (Korean: 순정에 반하다; lit. 'Fall in Love with Soon-jung') is a 2015 South Korean television series starring Jung Kyung-ho, Kim So-yeon, and Yoon Hyun-min. It aired on JTBC from April 3 to May 23, 2015 on Fridays and Saturdays at 21:45 (KST) for 16 episodes.

== Synopsis ==
Kang Min-ho (Jung Kyung-ho) is a cold-blooded corporate raider who takes no prisoners. He is a scoundrel investment banker for Gold Investment, seemingly the world's largest financial service firm. As a cynical, self-defensive, suspicious sociopath, he wears people down with his tenacity and takes advantage of them with his delusions of grandeur. However, Min-ho has his own story of how he became evil - it was because of his uncle's betrayal. His father was overthrown by his uncle and it caused his family to hit bottom. As Min-ho vows to get revenge, he meets Soon-jung (Kim So-yeon), the daughter of his father's former secretary who betrayed him and who now works for his uncle. One day, he has a heart attack and is taken to a hospital. He miraculously survives his heart attack after undergoing a heart transplant. His heart is actually from Dong-wook (Jin Goo), a young detective and Soon-jung's fiancé, who suffered from brain damage from a mysterious car accident. After receiving a new life thanks to the new heart, he is no longer the cold and callous person that he has been and undergoes a profound change to his personality, talking differently and warming up people. But he still pursues his plan to get revenge on his uncle even though his emotions get in the way at times. He gradually learns the meaning of happiness when he finds Soon-jung, whom he wants to cherish and protect. His heart becomes tender and his eyes swell with tears when he works with her. He falls in love with her without realizing it.

== Cast ==
- Jung Kyung-ho as Kang Min-ho
  - Lee Tae-woo as young Min-ho
- Kim So-yeon as Kim Soon-jung
  - Jung Da-bin as young Soon-jung
- Yoon Hyun-min as Lee Joon-hee
- Jin Goo as Ma Dong-wook
- Gong Hyun-joo as Han Ji-hyun
- Lee Si-eon as Oh Woo-sik
- Park Yeong-gyu as Kang Hyun-chul
- Ahn Suk-hwan as Ma Tae-seok
- Nam Myung-ryul as Lee Jung-gu
- Jo Eun-ji as Na Ok-hyun
- --- as Min Hye-ri
- --- as Kang Sung-min
- --- as Kang Ji-min
- Kim Jung-seok as Director Yoon
- Lee Soo-ji as Oh Mi-ru
- Jung Yoo-min as Yoo Yoo-mi
- Im Sung-eun
- Kim Hee-jung as Kang Min-ho's mother
- Jang Tae-sung
- Ricky Kim as Wigo (cameo, ep. 4)

== International broadcast ==
- Philippines: GMA Network aired the series under the title Carmina replacing Dangwa from February 1 to March 23, 2016. Re-aired on GMA News TV in 2019
