= Oh Eun-young =

South Korean psychiatrist (born 1965)

- 오은영
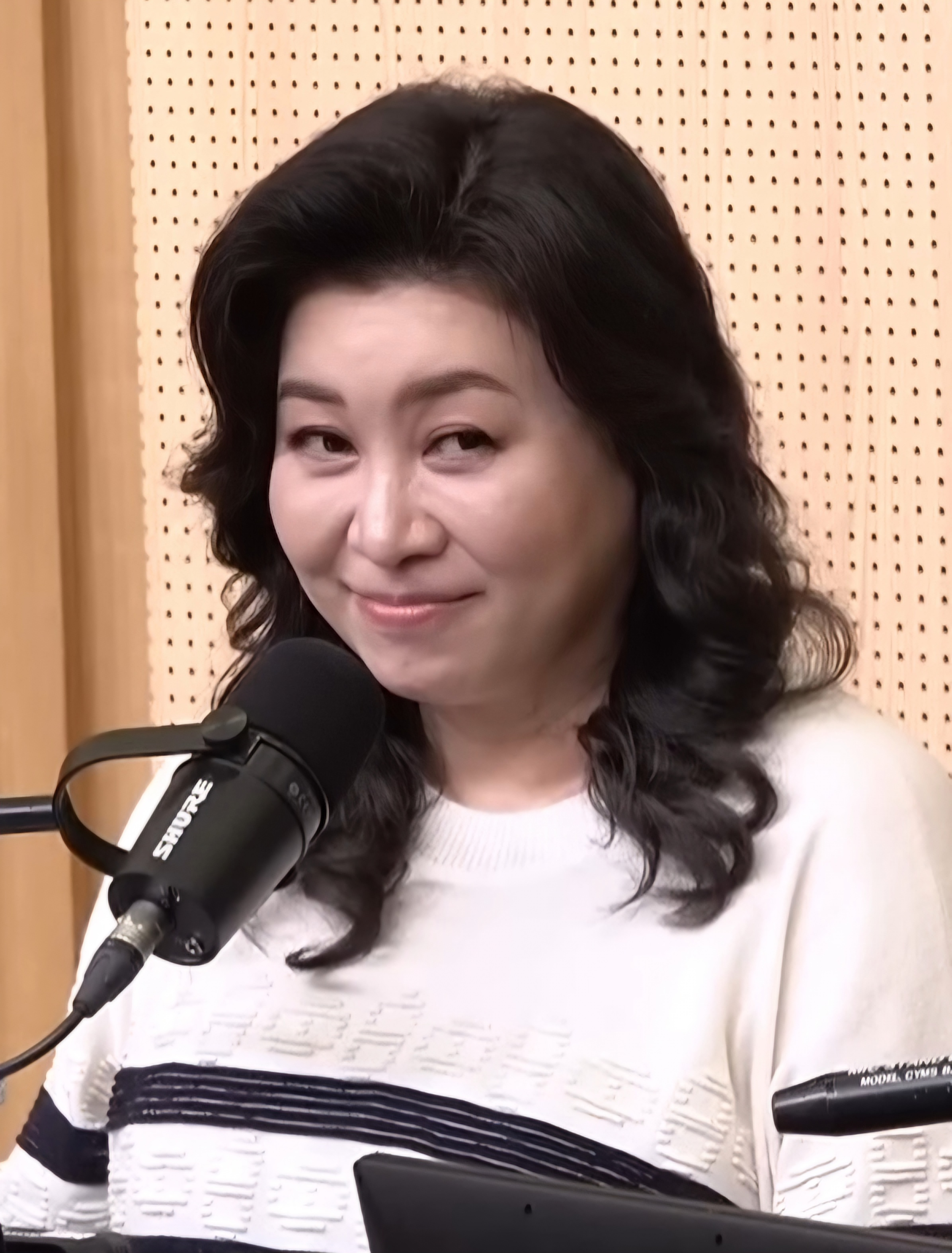
- Oh in 2023
- Born: September 9, 1965 (age 61)
- Education: Yonsei University (BA); Korea University (MD)
- Notable work: Our Children Have Changed; My Golden Kids

Oh Eun-young (Korean: 오은영; born September 9, 1965) is a South Korean pediatric psychiatrist and television host. She is the host of My Golden Kids, a weekly show that consults children with emotional and behavioral disorders. Oh also operates a hospital and four counseling centers.

== Education ==
Oh graduated from Yonsei University with a medical degree and received a doctorate in psychiatry from Korea University.

== Career ==
Oh started her career as a medical doctor in 1996.

Her media career began with the SBS’ consulting program, Our Children Have Changed, which aired from 2005 to 2015.

In 2020, she began hosting My Golden Kids, one of the most popular reality television shows in South Korea. On the show, she observes the behavior of children and provides tips to parents. Oh also hosts the shows Oh Eun-young’s Report: Marriage Hell where she counsels couples, and Dr. Oh’s Golden Clinic where she counsels individuals.

Oh has received widespread criticism for setting unrealistic standards for parents and teachers for taking care of children.
