= Yoon Hyun-min =

South Korean actor, former baseball player (born 1985)

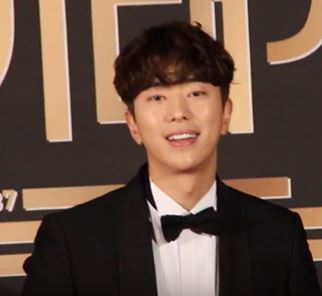
- Yoon in December 2017
- Born: April 15, 1985 (age 41); Seoul, South Korea
- Occupation: Actor
- Years active: 2007–present
- Agent: EL Park

Korean name
- Hangul: 윤현민
- Hanja: 尹賢敏
- RR: Yun Hyeonmin
- MR: Yun Hyŏnmin

Yoon Hyun-min (Korean: 윤현민; born April 15, 1985) is a South Korean actor.

== Biography ==
After graduating from Cheongwon high school, Yoon was a baseball player for the Hanwha Eagles in 2005 and the Doosan Bears in 2006. He fell in love with the stage after watching Finding Kim Jong-wook, and quit sports to start acting in 2007, starring in the musical Spring Awakening.

Yoon later transitioned to television dramas, making his debut in the OCN drama Joseon Mystery Detective Jeong Yak-yong. He has since taken on notable supporting roles in Heartless City (2013), A Witch's Love (2014), Discovery of Love (2014), and Beating Again (2015)

Yoon played his first leading role in the family drama My Daughter, Geum Sa-wol (2015). He gained increased recognition after starring in crime drama Tunnel. Yoon then played lead roles in legal drama Witch at Court (2017), and fantasy romance drama Tale of Fairy (2018). In 2019, Yoon was cast in Netflix's science fiction romance series My Holo Love.

In 2020, Yoon starred in the romantic comedy Men Are Men alongside Hwang Jung-eum and Seo Ji-hoon.

== Filmography ==
=== Film ===
Year	Title	Role	Notes	Ref.
2011	Pitch High	Sang-tae		
2016	Run Off	Coach Kim	Cameo	
2023	Marrying the Mafia	Park Dae-seo		
2023	Taste of Horror – Gym for Residents		Short Film	

=== Television series ===
Year	Title	Role	Ref.
2009	Joseon Mystery Detective Jeong Yak-yong	Kim Ji Sang	
2010	More Charming by the Day	Yoon Hyun-min	
2010	Yaksha	Son of second state councilor	
2010	Kiss and the City		
2012	Still You	Lee Jae-ha	
2013	Heartless City	Kim Hyun-soo	
2014	Inspiring Generation	Toyama Aoki	
2014	A Witch's Love	Yong Soo-cheol	
2014	Discovery of Love	Do Joon-ho	
2014	Drama Festival: "House, Mate"	Sang-woo	
2015	Beating Again	Lee Joon-hee	
2015	My Daughter, Geum Sa-wol	Kang Chan-bin	
2016	A Beautiful Mind	Hyun Suk-joo	
2016	The Good Wife	Kim Sae-byuk (cameo, ep 13)	
2017	Tunnel	Kim Seon-jae	
2017	Witch at Court	Yeo Jin-wook	
2018	Tale of Fairy	Jung Yi-hyun	
2020	My Holo Love	Go Nan-do / Holo	
2020	Men Are Men	Hwang Ji-Woo	
2020	Get Revenge	Cha Min-joon	
2022	The Driver	Cameo	
2023	True to Love	Lee Soo-hyuk	
2025	Our Golden Days	Park Sung-jae	

=== Television shows ===
Year	Title	Role	Notes	Ref.
2021	Legendary Actors	Main Cast	Chuseok special program	
2021	Racket Boys	Cast Member		
2022	Back to the Ground	Applicant		

== Theater ==
Year	Title	Role	Notes/Ref.
2010	Finding Kim Jong-wook	Kim Jong-wook/First Love	Reprised in 2012
2011	Spring Awakening	Melchior	
2012	Bachelor's Vegetable Store	Lee Tae-seong	
2013–2014	Triangle	Do-yeon	

== Discography ==
Year	Title	Album	Notes/Ref.
2016	"I Love You Today"	My Daughter, Geum Sa-wol OST	
2016	"Splitting"	—N/a	Outsider feat. Yoon Hyun-min
2017	"That You Loved Me"	Witch at Court OST	

== Awards and nominations ==
Year	Award	Category	Nominated work	Result	Ref.
2014	KBS Drama Awards	Best New Actor	Inspiring Generation, Discovery of Love	Nominated	
2014	KBS Drama Awards	Best Couple Award with Kim Seul-gi	Discovery of Love	Nominated	
2015	MBC Drama Awards	Excellence Award, Actor in a Special Project Drama	My Daughter, Geum Sa-wol	Nominated	
2015	MBC Drama Awards	Best New Actor in a Special Project Drama	My Daughter, Geum Sa-wol	Won	
2015	MBC Drama Awards	Popularity Award, Actor	My Daughter, Geum Sa-wol	Nominated	
2015	MBC Drama Awards	Best Couple Award with Baek Jin-hee	My Daughter, Geum Sa-wol	Nominated	
2017	KBS Drama Awards	Excellence Award, Actor in a Miniseries	Witch's Court	Nominated	
2017	KBS Drama Awards	Netizen Award, Actor	Witch's Court	Nominated	
2017	KBS Drama Awards	Best Couple Award with Jung Ryeo-won	Witch's Court	Won	
2025	Asia Model Awards	Popularity Award – Actor	Yoon Hyun-min	Won	
