= Kim So-hee (actress) =

South Korean actress (born 2000)

- Born: Kim So-hee; 10 January 2000 (age 26); Daegu, South Korea
- Other name: Kim Soo-hui
- Occupations: Actress; model
- Years active: 2016–present
- Agent: Crevic Entertainment

Kim So-hee is a South Korean actress and model known for her roles in movies such as The Truth Beneath, and in dramas such as Sweet Revenge 2 and Solomon's Perjury.

== Early life and career ==
Kim So-hee is a South Korean actress. She was born on January 10, 2000, in Daegu, South Korea. She made her first acting debut in the 2016 film The Truth Beneath and then in the same year, she also appeared in the television drama Solomon's Perjury as Kim Soo-hee.

== Filmography ==
=== Television series ===
Year	Title	Role	Ref.
2016	Solomon's Perjury	Kim Soo-hee	
2018	Sweet Revenge 2	Geum Soo-ji	
2021	Imitation	Joo Min-sung	
2023	Night Has Come	Baek Eun-ha	

=== Film ===
Year	Title	Role	Language	Ref.
2016	The Truth Beneath	Choi Mi-ok	Korean	
2018	I Have a Date with Spring	Lee Han-na	Korean	
2019	Hello, My Cat	Na-rae	Korean	
2023	The Pinwheel	Mi-ja	Korean	
2023	Brave Citizen	Do-hui	Korean	
