= Kim Na-young (actress) =

South Korean actress (born 1995)

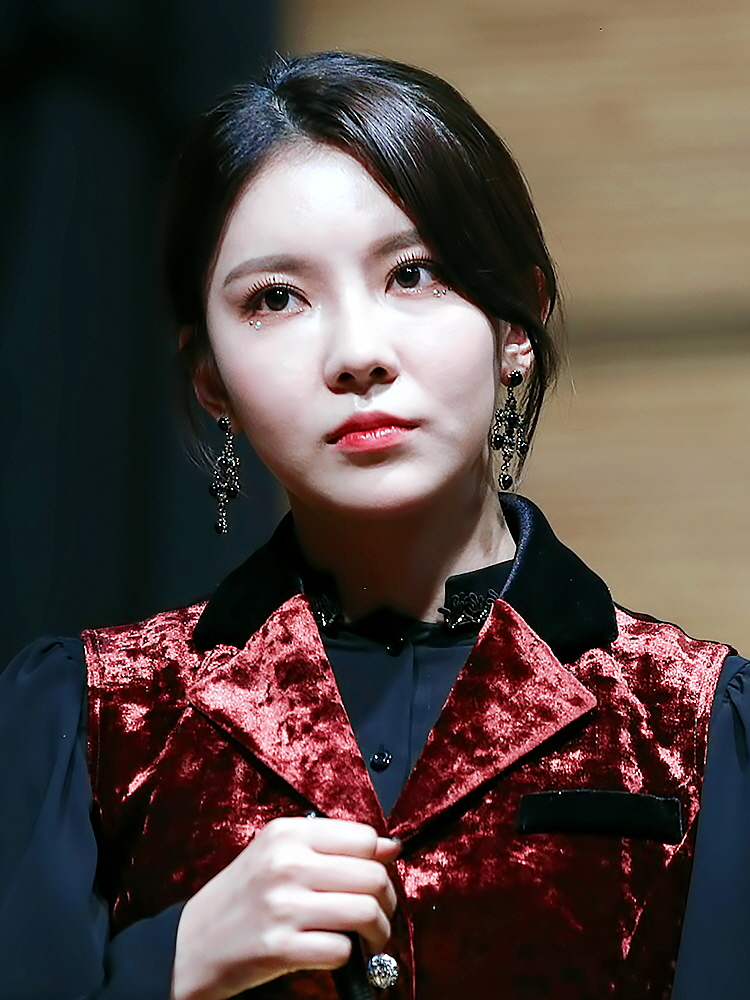
- Kim in 2018
- Born: November 23, 1995 (age 30); Seoul, South Korea
- Education: Baekseok University of Arts, Department of Applied Music
- Occupations: Actress; singer
- Years active: 2016–present
- Agent: Good Man Story
- Musical career
- Genres: K-pop
- Instrument: Vocals
- Years active: 2016–2022
- Label: Jellyfish
- Formerly of: Gugudan; Gugudan SeMiNa

Korean name
- Hangul: 김나영
- Hanja: 金娜英
- RR: Gim Nayeong
- MR: Kim Nayŏng

Kim Na-young (Korean: 김나영; born November 23, 1995), known mononymously as Nayoung, is a South Korean actress and singer. She joined Mnet's girl group survival show Produce 101 and the 14th position, falling short of becoming a member of the final lineup for the project girl group I.O.I. She was also a member of Jellyfish Entertainment's girl group Gugudan. Following the group's disbandment in 2020, Kim is currently active as an actress.

== Early life and education ==
Kim Na-young was born November 23, 1995, in Seoul. She went to Seoul Jeongmok Elementary School and Shinmok Middle School. Then enrolled in Gyeongbok Girls' High School. She then pursued higher education in Baekseok University of Arts, Department of Applied Music.

In 2016, Kim passed Jellyfish Entertainment's auditions, thus becoming a trainee.

== Career ==
=== 2016: First television appearances ===
In January 2016, Kim Na-young represented Jellyfish Entertainment together with fellow trainees Kim Se-jeong and Kang Mi-na on the reality survival show Produce 101 for the chance to debut in an Mnet Project girl group. All three were assigned to "Group A" in the first episode of the program and Kim achieved the first-place ranking on several episodes. Kim Na-young was the 14th rank contestant of the season.

=== 2016–2018: Gugudan and SeMiNa ===
Kim Na-young was revealed as a member of Jellyfish Entertainment's upcoming girl group on June 10, 2016, with stage name Nayoung. On June 13, Jellyfish Entertainment revealed that the Group would be a nine-member group. On June 17, Jellyfish Entertainment announced the group name, Gugudan. On June 22, it was confirmed that Gugudan were making their debut with a "mermaid" concept. The highlight medley of the group's debut mini-album was released on June 24. Nayoung debuted with Gugudan on June 28, 2016, with the mini-album, Act. 1 The Little Mermaid, with "Wonderland" as the title song. She was positioned as one of the group's main vocalist.

Gugudan went on to release their second mini album, Act.2 Narcissus, and its title track, "A Girl Like Me" on February 27, 2017. In the same year, Nayoung became the regular host of OnStyle's beauty-focused variety show. She also made a cameo in Children of the 20th Century in 2017. On November 8, Gugudan released their first single album, Act.3 Chococo Factory, featuring the title track, "Chococo".

The group released their second single album, Act.4 Cait Sith, on February 1, 2018, with its lead single "The Boots".

In June 2018, Nayoung joined the second subunit of Gugudan with fellow Produce 101 alumni members Mina and Sejeong. It was named Gugudan SeMiNa (Korean: 구구단 세미나). The "SeMiNa" name is made up of the first syllables of the members' names. They debuted on July 10, 2018, with the single "SeMiNa".

On September 19, Gugudan made their official debut in Japan with the release of their first Japanese single, "Stand By." Two days later, on September 21, they held their debut showcase and fan meeting titled "Gugudan 1st Showcase & Fanmeeting 'Dear Friend'" at Tokyo Akasaka Blitz in Japan.

Gugudan released their third single album, Act.5 New Action, on November 6. It was containing six tracks with the lead single "Not That Type". The end of the promotion period for the mini album was quickly followed by the group's first ever solo concert. Titled "Gugudan 1st Concert Play". It was held on December 1 and 2 at the Ewha Womans University Auditorium in Seodaemun District, Seoul. The group further embarked on their first Japan tour, starting in Osaka and Tokyo on December 7, 2018.

=== 2019–present: Solo career, musical debut and career as an actress ===
Nayoung embarked on her acting career by venturing into the world of musicals. On April 19, 2019, it was announced that Nayoung would be part of the cast for the musical Mephisto. She shared the role of Marghetta with Sunwoo and Minji Lim from the group Fiesta. The musical took place at Gwanglim Art Center BBCH Hall from May 25 to July 28.

In 2019, Nayoung debuted in the theater play 'Why Did You Come to My House,' a romantic comedy about a man and a woman with different nationalities and personalities who end up sharing a house. Nayoung played the role of Seo Jae-hee, a charismatic woman with a hidden sadness. The play ran for six months at Daehakro from September to March. Nayoung expressed her worries about her first theatrical experience but successfully completed the play with the support of fans, fellow actors, and the dedicated Staff.

As Gugudan kicked off the start of their fourth year, the group's number of activities began to decline drastically and they entered their unofficial hiatus era. On December 30, 2020, it was announced that Gugudan officially disbanded after two years without group's activities. Their final schedule was completed on December 31, 2020. Jellyfish also announced that all of the members would stay with the company.

On her personal social media account, Nayoung made an announcement regarding the termination of her contract with Jellyfish Entertainment, effective from March 31, 2021. Following this, she held a solo performance titled "Nayoung's Sweet Summer Day&Night" on June 27, 2021. Gugudan Hana and Haebin participated in the performance as special guests.

On January 3, 2022, it was announced that Kim has signed a contract with Good Man Story and would be promoting using her birth name Kim Na-young moving forward. The same year, Nayoung joined the musical Gwangju, which is based on the May 1980 Gwangju Uprising, a pro-democracy movement. The musical depicts the passionate struggle of ordinary citizens to protect their everyday lives. It premiered in early 2019, marking the 40th anniversary of the pro-democracy movement, and received high praise as the Les Misérables of Asia. Nayoung portrays Jung Hwa-in, a caring and warm-hearted music teacher who runs a music school and takes care of students and citizen soldiers. The musical opened on April 15 at the CJ Towol Theater in the Seoul Arts Center.

In December 2022, the production company Ark Company revealed the entire cast of The Seagull, a play written by Anton Chekhov, a prominent Russian playwright. Kim Na-young passed the audition and acted in the role of Masha, who was saddened by her crushing unrequited love for Treblev. She was double cast with Shin Do-hyun. Within a first week of her performance, Kim Na-young was praised for her rich performance.

In October 2023, Kim Na-young was announced as part of the cast of Realise Happiness. This production is an adaptation to Korean setting of 2019 play Memory in Dream. Kim Na-young successfully passed a highly competitive private audition and was cast in the role of Lee Eun-soo, an art museum docent and curator who fatefully encounters a warm-hearted man named Kim Woo-jin in Seoul. Kim Na-young shared the role with Kim Seul-gi. They are acting alongside Kim Seon-ho, Lee Dong-ha, and Ahn Woo-yeon who are triple-cast in the role of Kim Woo-jin, a character with aspirations of becoming a photographer.

On August 27, 2024, Kim was cast alongside Seo Byeok-jun in the short-form drama My Man's Smartphone (lit.) which set to premiere on September 4.

== Discography ==
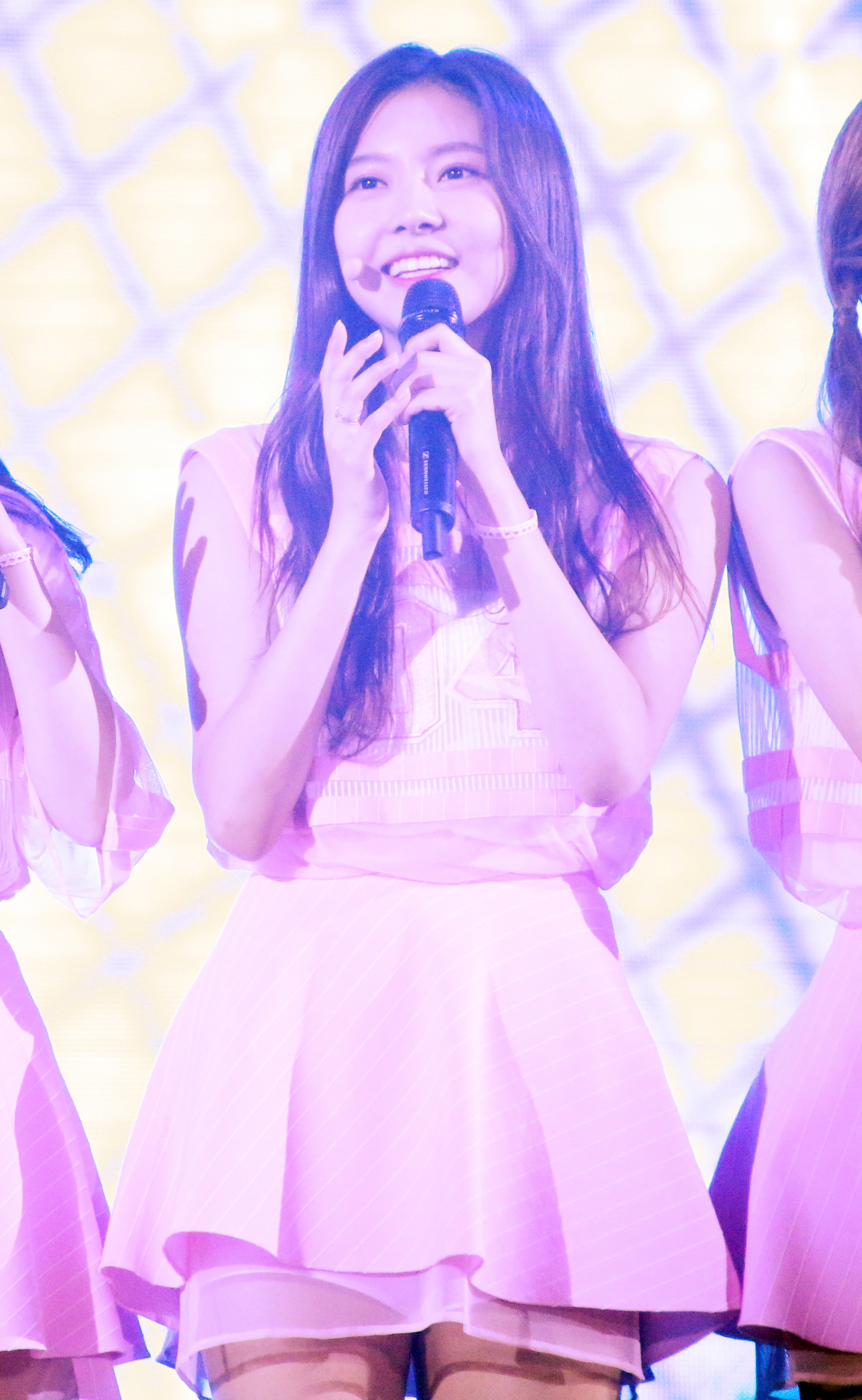
Kim at MBC Show Champion in Manila in 2018

=== Singles ===
List of singles, showing year released and name of the album
Title	Year	Album
"Taxi" (Sunny Girls: Eunha, YooA, Cheng Xiao, Nayoung and Nancy)	2016	Inkigayo Music Crush Part. 2

== Videography ==
=== Music video appearances ===
Music video appearances
Year	Title	Artist(s)	Ref.
2016	"Dynamite"	VIXX	
2016	"Fantasy"	VIXX	
2016	"The Closer"	VIXX	

== Filmography ==
=== Television series ===
Year	Title		Role	Notes	Ref.
Year	English	Korean	Role	Notes	Ref.
2016	Sweet Stranger and Me	우리집에 사는 남자	Herself	Cameo	

=== Web series ===
Year	Title		Role	Ref.
Year	English	Korean	Role	Ref.
2023	Golf Lenses	골프렌즈	Chae Seo-jin	
2024	My Man's Smartphone (lit.)	내 남자의 스마트폰	Ji-yu	

=== Television shows ===
Year	Title	Role	Notes	Ref.
2016	Produce 101	Contestant	Finished 14th	
2017	Charm TV	Host		
2017	Beauty Idol	Host		
2017	Battle Trip	Featured Traveller		
2017	Immortal Songs: Singing the Legend	Contestant		
2017	Non-Summit	Panel		
2017	Reconstruction of Memories	Performer		
2017	I Came Alone-Some Trip	Cast member		
2018	Teacher's War	Cast member		
2018	King of Mask Singer	Contestant		
2019	V-1	Contestant		

== Stage ==
=== Concert ===
Concert performances of Kim Na-young
Year	Title		Venue	Date	Ref.
Year	English	Korean	Venue	Date	Ref.
2019	Nayoung's Sweet Summer Day&Night	나영's Sweet Summer Day&Night	Rolling Hall Seoul	June 27	

=== Musical ===
Musical play performances of Kim Na-young
Year	Title		Role	Venue	Date	Ref.
Year	English	Korean	Role	Venue	Date	Ref.
2019	Mephisto	메피스토	Marghetta	Gwanglim Art Center BBCH Hall	May 25 – July 28	
2022	Gwangju	광주	Jeong Hwa-in	Seoul Arts Center CJ Towol Theater	April 15 – May 1	
2022	Gwangju	광주	Jeong Hwa-in	Bitgoeul Citizen Cultural Center	May 14 – 15	

=== Theater ===
Theater play performances of Kim Na-young
Year	Title		Role	Venue	Date	Ref.
Year	English	Korean	Role	Venue	Date	Ref.
2019–2020	Why Did You Come to My House	우리집에 왜 왔니	Seo Jae-hee	Daehakro Space Owl	September 6 – March 1	
2022	Why Did You Come to My House	우리집에 왜 왔니	Seo Jae-hee	JTN Art Hall 1	July 12 – September 12	
2022–2023	The Seagull	갈매기	Masha	Universal Arts Center	Dec 21 – Feb 5	
2023–2024	Realise Happiness	행복을 찾아서	Lee Eun-soo	Daehak-ro TOM 2	December 5 – February 18	
