= Shin Yeon-suh =

South Korean actress (born 1993)

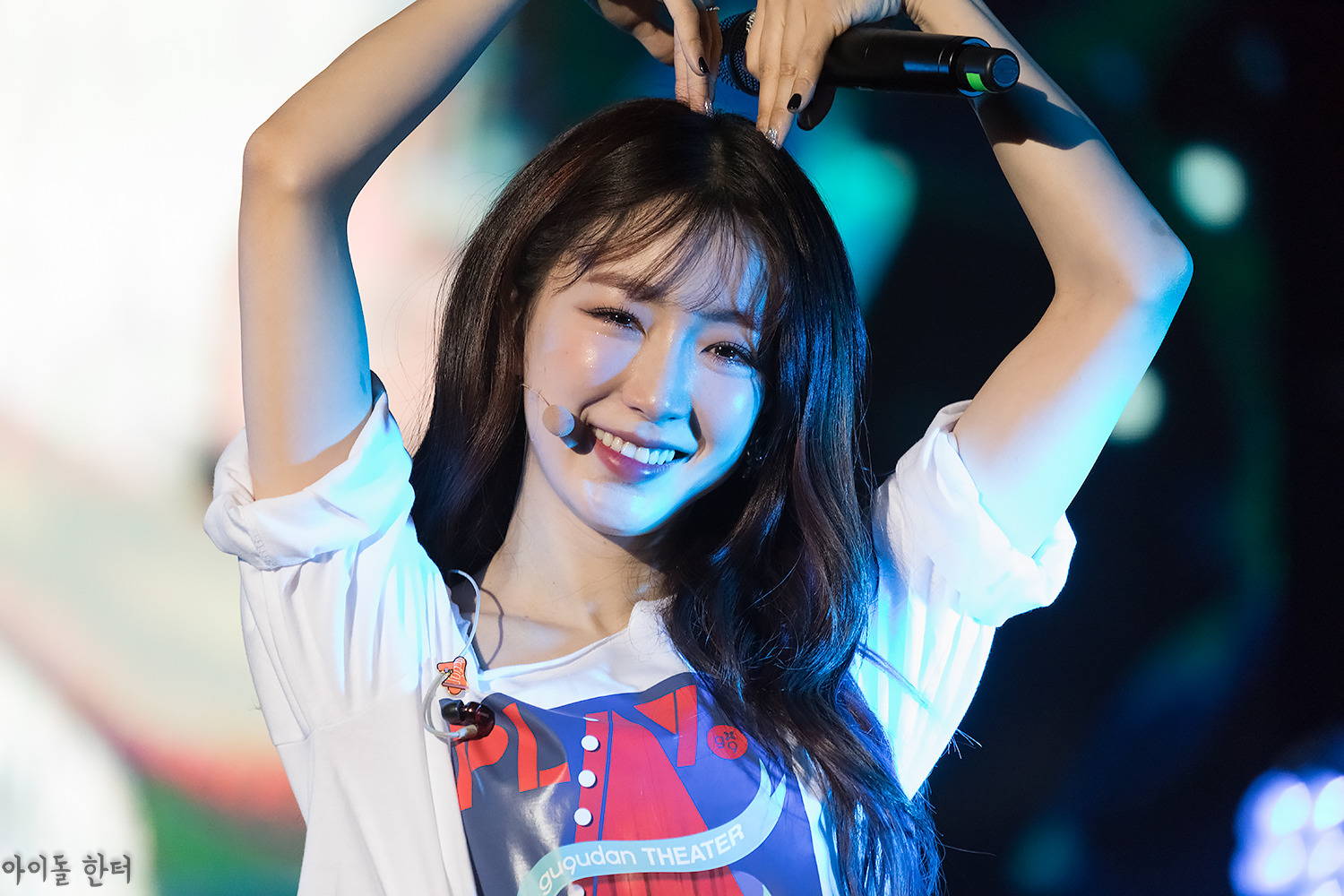
- Shin in December 2018
- Born: Shin Bo-ra; April 30, 1993 (age 33); Bucheon, South Korea
- Education: Seokyeong University
- Occupations: Actress; singer
- Years active: 2016–2023
- Agent: Mue A
- Musical career
- Also known as: Hana
- Genres: K-pop
- Instrument: Vocals
- Years active: 2016–2021
- Label: Jellyfish
- Formerly of: Gugudan

Korean name
- Hangul: 신보라
- Hanja: 辛寶羅
- RR: Sin Bora
- MR: Sin Pora

Stage name
- Hangul: 신연서
- Hanja: 辛妍徐
- RR: Sin Yeonseo
- MR: Sin Yŏnsŏ

Shin Yeon-suh (Korean: 신연서; born Shin Bo-ra on April 30, 1993), formerly known as Hana, is a South Korean actress and singer. She debuted in 2016 as a member and leader of girl group Gugudan. Following the group's disbandment in 2020, Shin turned to an acting career.

== Life and career ==
=== 1993–2014: Early life and career beginnings ===
Shin was born on April 30, 1993, in Bucheon, South Korea. She graduated from Seokyeong University. Shin made a cameo role in the High School King of Savvy as a high school girl in 2014 before her debut with Gugudan.

=== 2016–2024: Gugudan and acting debut ===
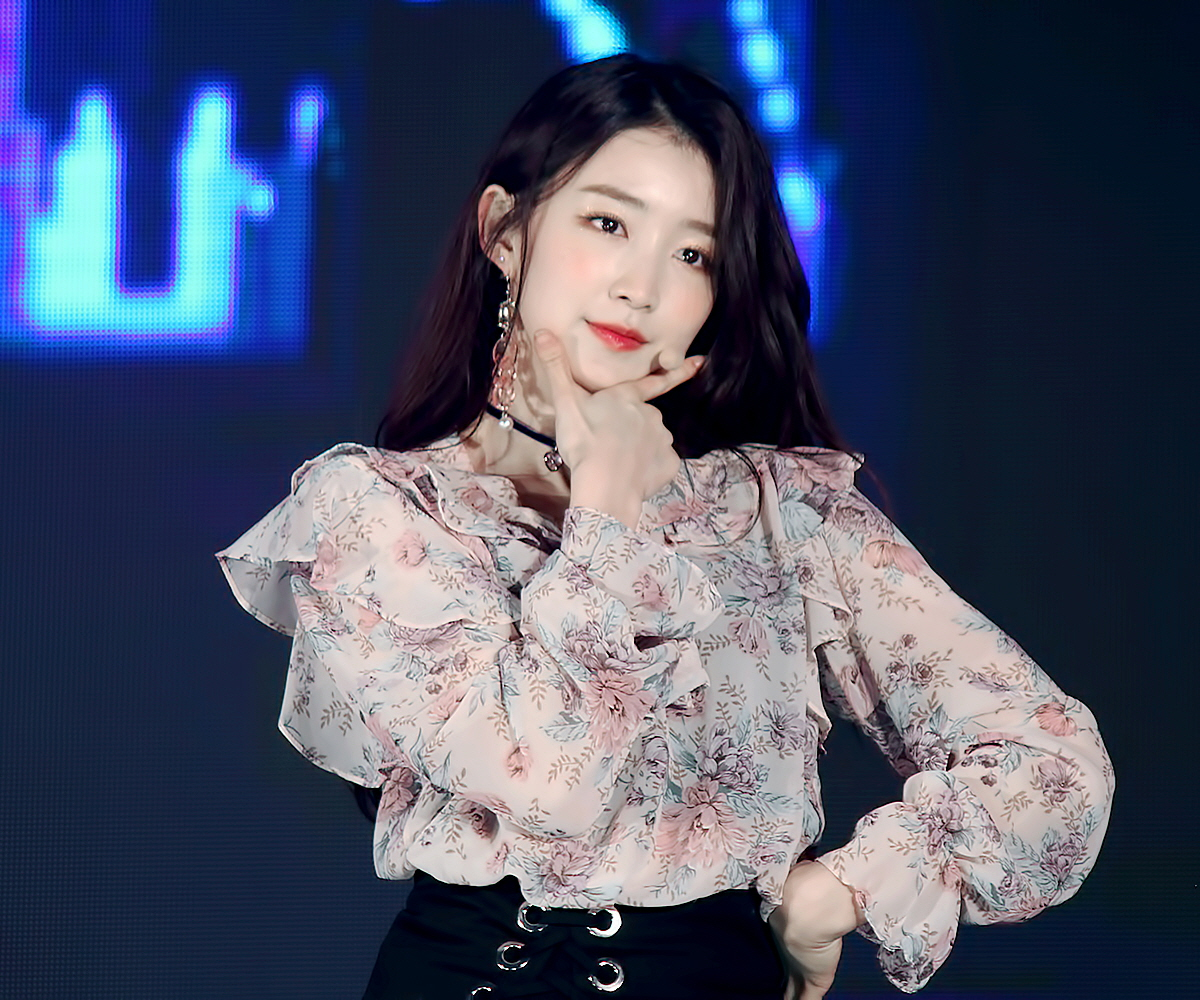
Shin at Ansan Workers Music Festival in 2017

On June 14, 2016, Shin was revealed as a member of Jellyfish Entertainment's upcoming girl group. On June 22, it was confirmed that Gugudan were making their debut with a "mermaid" concept. The highlight medley of the group's debut mini-album was released on June 24. Shin debuted with Gugudan on June 28, 2016, with the mini-album, Act. 1 The Little Mermaid, with "Wonderland" as the title song. She participated in the soundtrack for the OCN television series My First Love with the track "Throbbing Weather".

Shin played her first main role in My Fuxxxxx Romance as Ahn Ji-young and as Shin Na-ra in Another Peaceful Day of Second-Hand Items both in 2020. Shin played alongside Go Geon-han in Save Me Oldie in 2021.

In December 2020, it was announced that Gugudan officially disbanded after two years without group's activities. She later left Jellyfish Entertainment after her contract expired on April 30, 2021.

In August 2021, it was announced that Shin has signed a contract with FN Entertainment and would be promoting using her birth name moving forward.

On February 21, 2024, Shin signed with Mue A Entertainment and would be promoting using stage name "Shin Yeon-suh" moving forward. Her last credited role was in 2024's Begins ≠ Youth.

=== Post entertainment career ===
On January 30, 2026, Shin confirmed that she had found a job as a flight attendant.

== Discography ==
=== Singles ===
| Title | Year | Album |
Collaborations
| "Color" (with Haebin) | 2023 | Non-album single |
Soundtrack appearances
| "Throbbing Weather" (설렘주의보) | 2018 | My First Love (애간장) OST |
| "Falling Down" | 2019 | Touch Your Heart (진심이 닿다) OST |
| "Walk in Space" | 2019 | Yeonnamdong Family (연남동 패밀리) OST |

== Filmography ==
=== Film ===
| Year | Title | Role | Ref. |
|---|---|---|---|
| 2023 | Annapurna | Pu-reum | |
| 2023 | She's From Another Planet | Na-eun | |

=== Television series ===
| Year | Title | Role | Notes | Ref. |
|---|---|---|---|---|
| 2014 | High School King of Savvy | High school girl | Cameo | |
| 2022 | KBS Drama Special: "Silence of the Lambs" | Jeong Ah-reum | Season 13 | |

=== Web series ===
| Year | Title | Role | Notes | Ref. |
|---|---|---|---|---|
| 2020 | My Fuxxxxx Romance | Ahn Ji-young | | |
| 2021 | Another Peaceful Day of Second-Hand Items | Shin Na-ra | | |
| 2021 | Save The Old Fossil | Lee Na-Eun | | |
| 2021 | Summer Guys | | Cameo (ep. 8) | |
| 2021 | Mr. Lee | Cha Eun-joo | | |
| 2023 | Our D-Day | Jang Woo-ri | | |
