= Liu Xiening =

Chinese actress (born 1996)

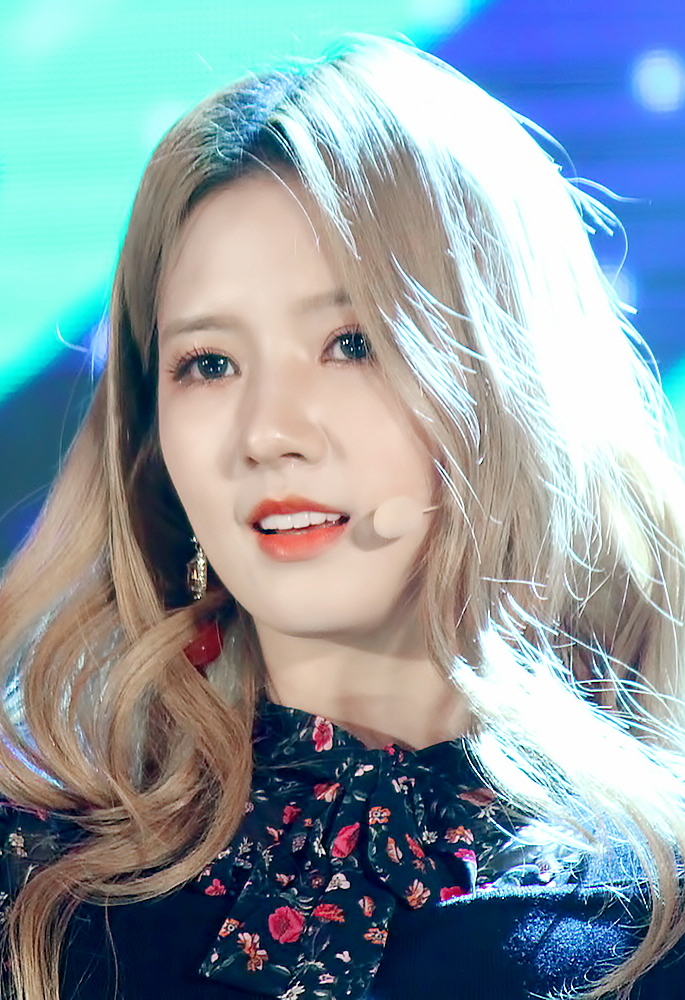
- Liu in 2017
- Born: October 23, 1996 (age 30); Shenzhen, Guangdong, China
- Education: Beijing Contemporary Music Academy
- Occupations: Actress; singer; dancer
- Years active: 2016–present
- Agent: T Entertainment
- Musical career
- Also known as: Sally
- Genres: Dance-pop; K-pop; C-pop
- Labels: Jellyfish; Wajijiwa (Note: As a member of BonBon Girls 303 only.)
- Formerly of: Gugudan; BonBon Girls 303

Chinese name
- Traditional Chinese: 劉些寧
- Simplified Chinese: 刘些宁
Transcriptions
Standard Mandarin
- Hanyu Pinyin: Liú Xiēníng

Liu Xiening (Chinese: 刘些宁, Korean: 류셰닝), also known by her English name Sally Liu or simply Sally, is a Chinese actress, singer and dancer. She is a former member of South Korean girl group Gugudan. She achieved recognition in China after finishing sixth in the survival show Produce Camp 2020, where she became a member of girl group BonBon Girls 303 for two years. Following the group's disbandment in July 2022, Liu is currently active as an actress.

== Early life ==
Liu was born in Shenzhen, Guangdong Province, China. She attended Beijing Contemporary Music Academy, majoring in dancing with the hope of becoming a dancer or member of a dance group. Her plan changed when, in 2015, she was scouted by representatives of Jellyfish Entertainment. After passing the audition process, she moved to South Korea, where she became a trainee under the talent agency for five mere months.

== Career ==
=== 2016–2018: Gugudan ===
On June 28, 2016, Liu debuted as a member of Gugudan with the mini album Act.1 The Little Mermaid. Liu was positioned as the group's lead dancer and rapper.

In 2017, Liu became the regular host of OnStyle's beauty-focused variety show. She also performed as a dancer at the 5th V Chart Awards in Macau. It marked her first time completing a solo schedule without other Gugudan members.

On February 1, 2018. Liu temporarily returns to China to film her debut web drama, Hello Debate Opponent. Following her return to South Korea, Gugudan released their third single album, Act.5 New Action, on November 6.

=== 2019: Gugudan's hiatus and return to China ===
As Gugudan kicked off the start of their fourth year, the group's number of activities began to decline drastically and they entered their unofficial hiatus era. During this time, Liu made her way back home to China. On April 15, Liu officially made her acting debut when Hello Debate Opponent was broadcast on Mango TV. On July 12, Liu announced on her official Weibo account that she had joined Hot Idol.

Later that year, Liu participated in Supernova Games 2019, which was broadcast on Tencent Video from October 12 to November 9.

=== 2020–2022: "Time to Bloom", Produce Camp 2020, Gugudan's disbandment and re-debut with BonBon Girls 303 ===
On February 21, Liu released her first Chinese digital single, titled "Time to Bloom". On April 8, it was announced that she would be participating as a contestant on the survival show Produce Camp 2020. The show itself started broadcasting on Tencent Video on May 2. While taking part on the show, she revealed in an interview that the members of Gugudan had been asked to leave their dorm by the agency, indicating that the group was on the brink of disbandment. Meanwhile, Liu went on to become one of the most popular contestants and ended up ranking sixth, hence becoming a member of the project girl group BonBon Girls 303. BonBon Girls 303 officially debuted on August 11, with the release of their first mini album, titled The Law of Hard Candy. On December 30, Jellyfish Entertainment confirmed the status of Gugudan, stating that the group would officially disband on December 31. On April 12, Liu was revealed to have moved to a new agency, T Entertainment. In August, Liu took part in the dance variety show, Masked Dancing King. She appeared in two episodes, disguised as the character 人间精灵.

On October 18, Liu began shooting her second web drama, Give You My Heart. She wrapped filming on December 27. While Liu was filming her new drama, Story of Kunning Palace, BonBon Girls 303 announced their disbandment on July 4. The group's pre-recorded online farewell event was broadcast on Tencent Video on July 24, marking the end of her journey as a BonBon Girls 303 member.

=== 2022–present: Group disbandment and acting activities ===
Two days before BonBon Girls 303's disbandment, the short drama Night of Love with You premiered on Tencent Video on July 2. It quickly gained a lot of following, continuously placing within the top ranks of various popularity lists alongside bigger, normal-length dramas. On October 11, it was reported that Night of Love with You was the short drama with the most playback in Q3 of 2022. Additionally, Liu's character, Luo Qing, ranked 16 and 20 at Vlinkage's and AiMan's most popular character indexes on July 18 and 19 respectively.

On February 8, Liu released her first single in three years, titled "城市Lady". The song was part of a compilation album, which featured tracks by Liu and five other young up-and-coming artists. The album premiered exclusively on Soda Music streaming app. On February 24, Jellyfish Entertainment announced that the agency and Liu have agreed to terminate her contract. On May 19, Liu was revealed to be part of the cast of the drama The Double, which is produced by noted screenwriter and producer Yu Zheng. On July 10, Liu was officially announced as a cast member in the drama Lady Revenger Returns from the Fire, which also stars actress Xu Lu.

On August 30, Liu wrapped filming for The Double. A few days later on September 16, she was revealed to have guest starred in the drama The Land of Warriors, the sequel to the popular 2021 drama, Douluo Continent.

== Discography ==
=== Singles ===
Title	Year	Album
"Time to Bloom" (留些绽放的时间)	2020	Non-album single
"City Lady" (城市Lady)	2023	Love in a Shadow

=== Soundtrack appearances ===
List of soundtrack appearances, showing year released and album name
Title	Year	Album
"Will Yearning Echo?"	2024	Burning Flames OST

== Filmography ==
=== Television series ===
Year	English title	Chinese title	Role	Notes	Ref.
2023	Only for Love	以爱为营	Bei Lin	Cameo	
2025	Perfect Match	五福临门	Shou Hua		

=== Web series ===
Year	English title	Chinese title	Role	Notes	Ref.
2019	Hello Debate Opponent	你好，对方辩友	Xiao En		
2022	Night of Love with You	夜色倾心	Luo Qing	Short drama	
2023	Story of Kunning Palace	宁安如梦	Princess Shen Zhi Yi		
2023	Destined	长风渡	Luo Yishui	Cameo	
2024	Burning Flames	烈焰	Bei Er		
2024	Lady Revenger Returns from the Fire	披荆斩棘的大小姐	Luo Ailian	Cameo	
2024	The Double	墨雨云间	Jiang Ruoyao		
2024	The Land of Warriors (Douluo Continent 2)	斗罗大陆之燃魂战	Qian Renxue	Cameo	
TBA	Give You My Heart	喂，给你我的小心心	Xu Zhi En		
TBA	Mama Go!	我的妈妈是校花	Lin Xurui		

=== Television shows ===
Year	Title	Role	Notes	Ref.
2020	Produce Camp 2020	Contestant	Finished 6th	
2021	Masked Dancing King Season 2	Regular Member	Elf On The Floor (Ep. 4–5)	
