= Another Peaceful Day of Second-Hand Items =

South Korean television show

- Promotional poster
- Also known as: Nara's Marvelous Days
- Hangul: 오늘도 평화로운 중고나라
- RR: Oneuldo pyeonghwaroun junggonara
- MR: Onŭldo p'yŏnghwaroun chunggonara
- Genre: Romance
- Created by: KODA (Korea Drama Producers Association)
- Written by: Choi Soo-young
- Directed by: Kim Jae-hong
- Starring: Hana; Lee Ka-eun; Kang Tae-joo
- Country of origin: South Korea
- Original language: Korean
- No. of episodes: 6 Episodes

Production
- Producer: KODA
- Production location: South Korea
- Running time: 10 – 15 minutes
- Production company: KODA

Original release
- Network: Naver TV Cast
- Release: January 21 – February 25, 2021

Another Peaceful Day of Second-Hand Items / Nara's Marvelous Days (Korean: 오늘도 평화로운 중고나라) is a South Korean web series. A production of KODA (Korea Drama Producers Association), aired on Naver TV Cast and V Live on January 21, 2021. It stars Gugudan's Hana, Lee Ka-eun and Kang Tae-joo.

== Synopsis ==
The drama tells the story of people who buy and sell secondhand items online. A woman was dumped by her long-term boyfriend and thought that she was "secondhand item" in dating. Another love story begins when she meets a man who helps her realize the value of things that are second-hand.

== Cast ==
=== Main ===
- Hana as Shin Na-ra
- Lee Ka-eun as Lee Ri-ah
- Kang Tae-joo as Yoo Eun-ho
