= Seokyeong University =

Private university in South Korea

- 서경대학교
- Type: Private
- Established: October 22, 1947; 78 years ago
- President: Kim Beom-Jun
- Academic staff: 625
- Students: 8,401
- Undergraduates: 8,000
- Postgraduates: 401
- Location: Seongbuk-gu, Seoul, South Korea; 37.615°N 127.013°E
- Campus: Urban
- Website: www.skuniv.ac.kr

Korean name
- Hangul: 서경대학교
- Hanja: 西京大學校
- RR: Seogyeong daehakgyo
- MR: Sŏgyŏng taehakkyo

Seokyeong University (SKU) is a private university in South Korea. The campus is located in 16-1 Jeongneung-dong, Seongbuk-gu, Seoul, South Korea.

== History ==
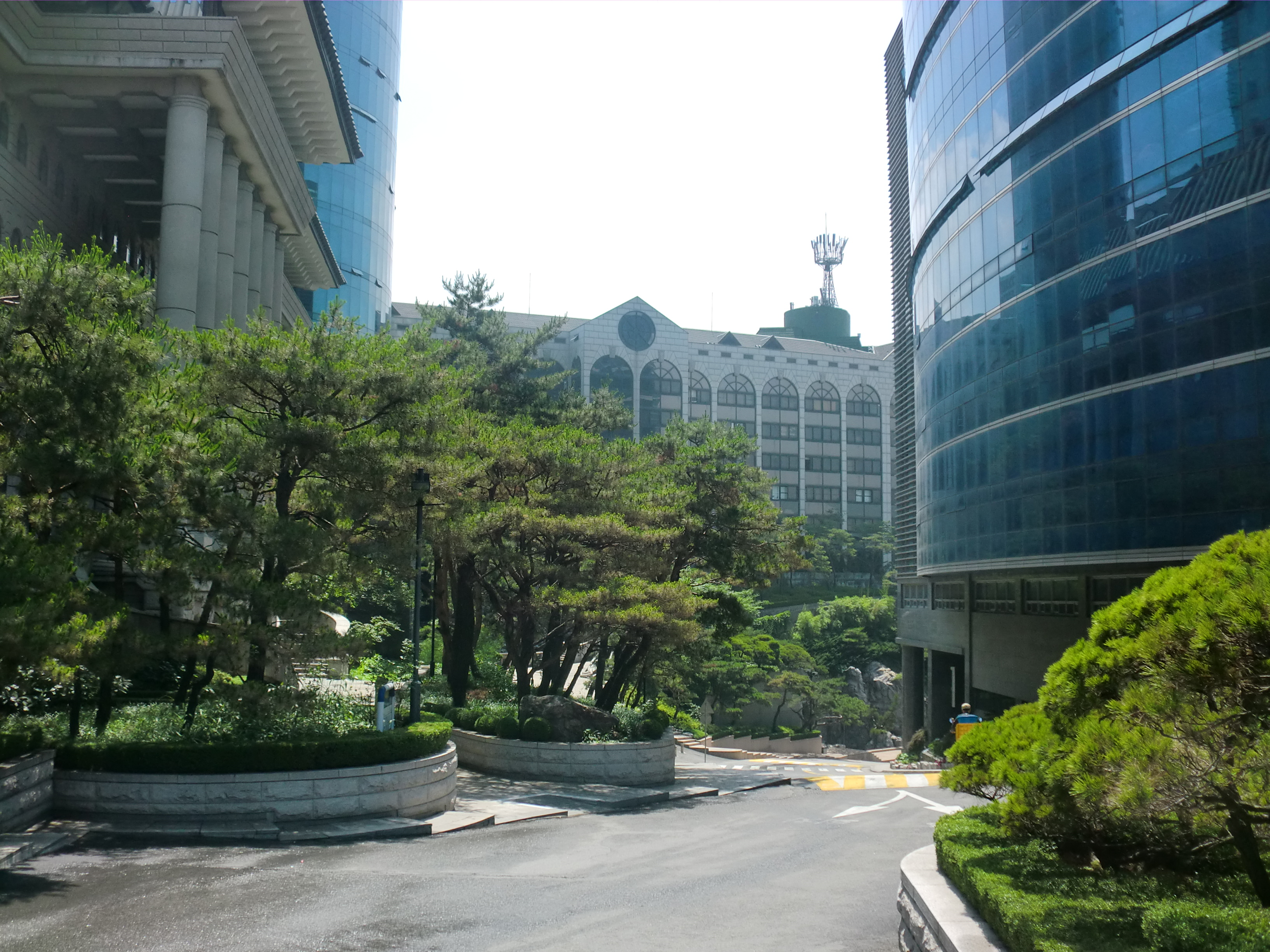

Seokyeong University was established in October 1947 as Hankook University (한국대학) which was the first 4-year evening school in Korea. It had difficulties during and after the Korean War, and in 1955 the school foundation was succeeded by Kookjae Hakwon; the university was renamed Kookjae University (국제대학, lit. "International University"; not to be confused with present-day Kookje University in Pyeongtaek).

The university was succeeded by several foundations and in 1988 it moved to the present campus. In 1989 an independent and dedicated foundation was established for the university. In April 1992 the university was licensed as a full-fledged university, and in September 1992 it was renamed Seokyeong University. Since November 1998 the enrollment of the daytime students has been made larger than that of the evening students.

== Colleges (undergraduate schools) ==
- College of Humanities and Social Sciences
- College of Science and Engineering
- College of Performing Arts
- College of Design & Film
- College of Beauty Arts
- Future Convergence University
- Convergence University
- College of Humanities and Liberal Arts

== Graduate schools ==
- Graduate School
- Graduate School of Management and Culture
- Graduate School of Beauty Arts
- Graduate School of Applied Music
- Convergence Graduate School
- International Convergence Graduate School

== Research institutes ==
- Institute of Liberal Arts
- Institute of Social Science
- Institute of Industry & Business Administration
- The Korean-Japanese Cultural Center
- Urban Research Center
- Institute of Unification Affairs
- Institute of Industrial Technology
- The Student Guidance Center
- Philosophical Thought Center
- Quality Academy
- Institute of Military Study

== Notable alumni ==
- Han Sang-jin, actor
- Lee Jang-woo, actor
- Hana, singer and actress (Gugudan)
- Jang Ki-yong, actor and model
- Choi Young-jae, singer (Got7)
- Jung seung hwan singer
