= Mama Fairy and the Woodcutter =

2018 South Korean television series

- Promotional poster
- Hangul: 계룡선녀전
- Lit.: Tale of Gyeryong Fairy
- RR: Gyeryong seonnyeojeon
- MR: Kyeryong sŏnnyŏjŏn
- Genre: Romance; Fantasy
- Based on: Tale of Gyeryong Fairy by Dol Bae
- Developed by: Studio Dragon
- Written by: Yoo Kyung-sun
- Directed by: Kim Yeon-cheol
- Starring: Moon Chae-won; Yoon Hyun-min; Seo Ji-hoon; Jeon Soo-jin; Kang Mi-na
- Country of origin: South Korea
- Original language: Korean
- No. of episodes: 16

Production
- Executive producer: Lee Jin-suk
- Camera setup: Single-camera
- Production company: JS Pictures

Original release
- Network: TVN
- Release: November 5 – December 25, 2018

Mama Fairy and the Woodcutter (Korean: 계룡선녀전) is a 2018 South Korean television series starring Moon Chae-won, Yoon Hyun-min, Seo Ji-hoon, Jeon Soo-jin and Kang Mi-na. It is based on the popular webtoon of the same title by Dol Bae which was first published via Naver WEBTOON in 2017. The series aired on tvN from November 5 to December 25, 2018.

== Cast ==
=== Main ===
- Moon Chae-won as Sun Ok-nam
  - Go Doo-shim as old Sun Ok-nam

A 699-year old fairy who currently works as a barista with the special ability to talk to plants. Only a few can see her otherworldly beauty while she appears to the majority as a humble old woman.

- Yoon Hyun-min as Jung Yi-hyun/Immortal Izy/Deer
  - Yoon So-yi as Immortal Izy

A biology professor. One of Ok-nam's potential husband reincarnations.

- Seo Ji-hoon as Kim Geum/Immortal Daube/Bausae the woodcutter

A graduate student and assistant professor at Lee Won University, Department of Biology. Another one of Ok-nam's potential husband reincarnations. He has the ability to communicate with animals.

- Jeon Soo-jin as Lee Ham-sook

A professor of psychology at Lee Won University who also works as a psychiatrist. A close friend to Jung Yi-hyun. She has a one-sided love for him.

- Kang Mi-na as Jeom Soon-yi

The daughter of Sun Ok-nam who can turn into a cat or a tiger under certain circumstances. A ghostwriter of an erotica.

=== Supporting ===
==== Deities ====
- Ahn Young-mi as Jo Bong-dae

A guardian deity who operates the coffee truck at Lee Won University.

- Ahn Gil-kang as Master Gu

A pigeon deity who'd lost the ability to fly.

- Go Geon-han as Park Shin-seon

An immortal wizard.

- Hwang Young-hee as Fairy Oh
- Im Ha-ryong as King Bukdu

==== Lee Won University ====
- Yoo Jung-woo as Eum Kyung-sul

An aspiring film director. He has a crush on Jeom Soon-yi.

- Yoo Ah-reum as Ahn Jung-min

A graduate student at the Lee Won University, Department of Biology.

- Ahn Seung-gyun as Oh Kyung-sik

A graduate student at the Lee Won University, Department of Biology.

- Yum Dong-hun as Professor Park

Jung Yi-hyun's rival.

- Kang Da-hyun as Prof. Jung's student

A student of Jung Yi-hyun's at Lee Won University.

===== Others =====
- Yoo In-soo as Prof. Jung's student
- Seo Cho-won as Supporting
- Han Da-hee as Jung Yi-hyun's first love
- Baek Hyun-joo as Kim Geum's mother
- Nash Ang as Kwang

==== Special appearances ====
- Han Hyun-min as Ethiopian exchange fairy
- Kim Sun-a as Butterfly-haired Eelworm (voice cameo)
- Jung Kyung-ho as Jeum Dol the Egg/Blue Dragon (voice cameo)
- Eric Mun as Alex the Frog (voice cameo)
- Jung Yu-mi as Lotus (voice cameo)
- So Hee-jung as Jeong Yi-hyeon's mother

== Production ==
Kang So-ra was cast in the lead female role but had to back out of the drama due to scheduling conflicts. The first script-reading occurred on May 27, 2018.

== Original soundtrack ==
Tale of Fairy OST

Soundtrack album by Various artists
- Released: 2018
- Genre: Soundtrack
- Languages: Korean; English
- Labels: Genie Music, Stone Music Entertainment, WithHC

=== Part 1 ===
Released on November 13, 2018
No.	Title	Lyrics	Music	Artist	Length
1.	"With Coffee"	Park Geun-chul; Dani	Lee Sang-hoon; Lee Jong-hoon	Hoons	03:16
2.	"With Coffee" (Inst.)		Lee Sang-hoon; Lee Jong-hoon		03:16
Total length:					06:32

=== Part 2 ===
Released on November 20, 2018
No.	Title	Lyrics	Music	Artist	Length
1.	"Peach Paradise"	Park Geun-chul; Dani	D.Soul	Mina (Gugudan)	03:31
2.	"Peach Paradise" (Inst.)		D.SOUL		03:31
Total length:					07:02

=== Part 3 ===
Released on November 27, 2018
No.	Title	Lyrics	Music	Artist	Length
1.	"Deer's Tears (feat. Saya!)" (사슴의 눈물)	Park Geun-chul; Jung Soo-min; Dani	Park Geun-chul; Jung Soo-min	Monday Kiz	04:15
2.	"Deer's Tears (feat. Saya!)" (Inst.)		Park Geun-chul; Jung Su-min		04:15
Total length:					08:30

=== Part 4 ===
Released on December 11, 2018
No.	Title	Lyrics	Music	Artist	Length
1.	"In My Dream"	Park Geun-chul; Runy	Runy; Iver	Runy	03:23
2.	"In My Dream" (Inst.)		Runy; Iver		03:23
Total length:					06:46

== Ratings ==
Tale of Fairy : South Korea viewers per episode (thousands)

Season	Episode number																Average
Season	1	2	3	4	5	6	7	8	9	10	11	12	13	14	15	16	Average
1	1343	1156	807	996	807	785	787	787	882	851	708	819	805	925	869	1026	897

Source: Audience measurement performed nationwide by Nielsen Media Research.

Average TV viewership ratings
Ep.	Original broadcast date	Average audience share (AGB Nielsen)	
Ep.	Original broadcast date	Nationwide	Seoul
1	November 5, 2018	5.628%	6.214%
2	November 6, 2018	4.992%	5.727%
3	November 12, 2018	3.140%	2.987%
4	November 13, 2018	4.157%	4.425%
5	November 19, 2018	3.371%	3.588%
6	November 20, 2018	3.579%	3.835%
7	November 26, 2018	3.300%	3.716%
8	November 27, 2018	3.481%	4.169%
9	December 3, 2018	3.576%	3.947%
10	December 4, 2018	3.889%	4.083%
11	December 10, 2018	3.004%	3.581%
12	December 11, 2018	3.330%	3.486%
13	December 17, 2018	3.683%	4.222%
14	December 18, 2018	3.862%	4.386%
15	December 24, 2018	3.698%	4.029%
16	December 25, 2018	3.787%	3.587%
Average		3.780%	4.124%
In the table above, the blue numbers represent the lowest ratings and the red numbers represent the highest ratings.; This drama airs on a cable channel/pay TV which normally has a relatively smaller audience compared to free-to-air TV/public broadcasters (KBS, SBS, MBC and EBS).
