= Kim Na-young =

Kim Na-young may refer to:

- Kim Na-young (television personality) (born 1981), South Korean television personality
- Kim Na-young (judoka) (born 1988), South Korean judoka
- Kim Na-young (figure skater) (born 1990), South Korean figure skater
- Kim Na-young (singer) (born 1991), South Korean singer
- Kim Na-young (actress) (born 1995), South Korean actress and former singer
