= Café Minamdang =

2022 South Korean television series

- Promotional poster
- Also known as: Minamdang: Case Note; Handsome Shaman
- Hangul: 미남당
- RR: Minamdang
- MR: Minamdang
- Genre: Mystery; Comedy; Romance
- Based on: Minamdang: Case Note by Jung Jae-han
- Written by: Park Hye-jin
- Directed by: Go Jae-hyun
- Starring: Seo In-guk; Oh Yeon-seo; Kwak Si-yang; Kang Mi-na; Kwon Soo-hyun
- Music by: Seo Seong-won
- Country of origin: South Korea
- Original language: Korean
- No. of episodes: 18

Production
- Running time: 70 minutes
- Production companies: People Story Company; AD406; Monster Union

Original release
- Network: KBS2
- Release: June 27 – August 23, 2022

Café Minamdang (Korean: 미남당; RR: Minamdang) is a 2022 South Korean television series starring Seo In-guk, Oh Yeon-seo, Kwak Si-yang, Kang Mi-na, and Kwon Soo-hyun. It is based on a web novel titled Minamdang: Case Note by writer Jung Jae-ha, which was serialized on KakaoPage and won the grand prize at the platform's web novel contest. It aired on KBS2 from June 27 to August 23, 2022, every Monday and Tuesday at 21:50 (KST). It is also available for streaming on Netflix in selected regions.

== Synopsis ==
The series follows the mysterious events experienced by a former profiler who became a shaman, and his colleagues. It also tells the story of a suspicious café named Minamdang and its customers.

== Cast ==
=== Main ===
- Seo In-guk as Nam Han-joon, a good-looking profiler-turned-swindler who is a shamanic heresy and has splendid speech skills.
- Oh Yeon-seo as Han Jae-hui, a third-year homicide detective who is righteous, lighthearted and quirky, but a sincere person.
  - Kim Min-seo as young Han Jae-hui
- Kwak Si-yang as Gong Soo-cheol: a barista at Minamdang during the day and a homicide detective at night.
- Kang Mi-na as Nam Hye-joon: Han-joon's younger sister who is a former NIS ace.
- Kwon Soo-hyun as Cha Do-won: an intelligent and wealthy prosecutor at the Western District Prosecutors' Office's Criminal Affairs Department.

=== Supporting ===
- Baek Seo-hoo as Jo Na-dan: a cute part-time employee at Minamdang who charms customers with his good looks and sweet nature.
- Jung Man-sik as Jang Doo-jin: a veteran detective of fifteen years.
- Heo Jae-ho as Kim Sang-hyeop: a passionate detective.
- Jung Ha-joon as Na Kwang-tae: a rookie detective.
- Jung Eun-pyo as Kim Cheol-geun: the chief of police.
- Hwang Woo-seul-hye as Lee Min-kyung: a VVIP customer of Minamdang.
- Baek Seung-ik as Park Jin-sang: the director of Joyce Entertainment.
- Kim Byung-soon as Park Dong-gi: Jin-sang's father who is the chairman of a property insurance company.
- Lee Jae-woon as Cha Seung-won: Do-won's older brother.
- Jung Da-eun as Auntie Im: a mysterious fortune teller.
- Won Hyun-jun as Gu Tae-soo

=== Extended ===
- Park Hae-in as Lee Ji-eun
- Moon Yu-bin
- Kim Won-sik as Shin Kyung-ho
- Kwon Hyuk as Jeong Cheong-gi
- Jang Hyuk-jin as Choi Young-seop
- Park Jun-seong as Do Jun-ha
- Jo Min-gyu as Hye-joon's boyfriend
- Kim Min-seol as Kang Eun-hye
- Park Dong-bin as Lee Myung-jun: mayor of Shinmyeong.
- Yoon Young-geol as Park Jeong-hyun: a member of the National Assembly.
- Cha Geon-woo as Nam Pil-goo: chief of the anti-corruption department of the Supreme Prosecutors' Office.
- Woo Jung-won as Jeong Hye-yoon: a psychiatrist.

=== Special appearances ===
- Song Jae-rim as Han Jae-jung
- Lee Si-eon as Yeo Chun-pal
- Lucy as Han-joon's ex-girlfriend
- Song Joo-hee as Min Yu-seon
- Cha Tae-hyun as a priest
- Eum Moon-suk as Dae-tong
- Heo Jung-min as a detective

== Production ==
The first script reading of the cast was held on November 19, 2021.

On March 29, 2022, Seo In-guk's agency announced that the actor temporarily halted filming for Café Minamdang after testing positive for COVID-19.

== Original soundtrack ==
=== Part 1 ===
Released on July 4, 2022
No.	Title	Lyrics	Music	Artist	Length
1.	"Ghost Buster"	Jo Gwang-il	Seo Cine	Jo Gwang-il	3:00
2.	"Ghost Buster" (Inst.)		Seo Cine		3:00
Total length:					6:00

=== Part 2 ===
Released on July 12, 2022
No.	Title	Lyrics	Music	Artist	Length
1.	"Stay Awake"	SFaceG; Lizlee; Dosi; LoveSong	SFaceG; Lizlee	Nam Young-joo	2:30
2.	"Stay Awake" (Inst.)		SFaceG; Lizlee		2:30
Total length:					5:00

=== Part 3 ===
Released on July 19, 2022
No.	Title	Lyrics	Music	Artist	Length
1.	"Endless Night" (끝나지 않는 밤)	Seo Cine	Seo Cine	Raina	4:13
2.	"Endless Night" (끝나지 않는 밤; Inst.)		Seo Cine		4:13
Total length:					8:26

=== Part 4 ===
Released on July 26, 2022
No.	Title	Lyrics	Music	Artist	Length
1.	"The Dance of Minamdang" (부채춤을 춘다)	Lee Jong-su; Landscape	Lee Jong-su; Landscape	Gonia; Yu Taepyungyang	3:14
2.	"The Dance of Minamdang" (부채춤을 춘다; Inst.)		Lee Jong-su; Landscape		3:14
Total length:					6:28

=== Part 5 ===
Released on August 2, 2022
No.	Title	Lyrics	Music	Artist	Length
1.	"Stay Here"	Seo Cine	Seo Cine	More	3:18
2.	"Stay Here" (Inst.)		Seo Cine		3:18
Total length:					6:36

=== Part 6 ===
Released on August 9, 2022
No.	Title	Lyrics	Music	Artist	Length
1.	"I Like You" (너를 좋아해)	Seo Cine	Seo Cine	Seo In-guk	2:85
2.	"I Like You" (너를 좋아해; Inst.)		Seo Cine		2:85
Total length:					5:56

=== Part 7 ===
Released on August 16, 2022
No.	Title	Lyrics	Music	Artist	Length
1.	"Still With You"	Seo Cine	Seo Cine	SuA	3:06
2.	"Still With You" (Inst.)		Seo Cine		3:06
Total length:					6:12

== Viewership ==
Café Minamdang : South Korea viewers per episode (thousands)

Season	Episode number																	
Season	1	2	3	4	5	6	7	8	9	10	11	12	13	14	15	16	17	18
1	967	935	1009	1041	827	837	812	855	770	967	795	817	N/A	800	823	868	899	1008

Source: Audience measurement performed nationwide by Nielsen Korea.

Average TV viewership ratings
Ep.	Original broadcast date	Average audience share		
Ep.	Original broadcast date	Nielsen Korea		TNmS
Ep.	Original broadcast date	Nationwide	Seoul	Nationwide
1	June 27, 2022	5.7% (13th)	5.7% (10th)	5.3% (13th)
2	June 28, 2022	5.6% (11th)	5.3% (14th)	5.0% (13th)
3	July 4, 2022	5.6% (12th)	5.6% (9th)	N/A
4	July 5, 2022	5.7% (10th)	5.8% (7th)	4.4% (15th)
5	July 11, 2022	4.8% (15th)	4.6% (17th)	4.6% (17th)
6	July 12, 2022	4.2% (18th)	4.1% (18th)	4.5% (17th)
7	July 18, 2022	4.5% (17th)	4.3% (17th)	N/A
8	July 19, 2022	5.0% (13th)	4.8% (14th)	3.9% (19th)
9	July 25, 2022	4.5% (15th)	4.6% (15th)	N/A
10	July 26, 2022	5.5% (9th)	5.7% (7th)	N/A
11	August 1, 2022	4.1% (19th)	4.1% (17th)	N/A
12	August 2, 2022	4.7% (14th)	4.5% (14th)	4.0% (17th)
13	August 8, 2022	3.7% (22nd)	N/A	N/A
14	August 9, 2022	4.3% (22nd)	N/A	N/A
15	August 15, 2022	4.5% (19th)	4.4% (19th)	N/A
16	August 16, 2022	5.0% (13th)	4.8% (14th)	4.3% (17th)
17	August 22, 2022	5.0% (13th)	5.1% (14th)	N/A
18	August 23, 2022	5.7% (11th)	5.6% (9th)	4.2% (18th)
Average		4.9%	— (Note: Due to some unpublished ratings, the exact average rating is unknown.)	—
In the table above, the blue numbers represent the lowest ratings and the red numbers represent the highest ratings.; N/A denotes rating that was not released.
