= Men Are Men =

2020 South Korean television series

- Promotional poster
- Also known as: To All the Guys Who Loved Me; Mister; All the Same
- Hangul: 그놈이 그놈이다
- Lit.: That Guy Is the Guy
- RR: Geunomi geunomida
- MR: Kŭnomi kŭnomida
- Genre: Drama; Comedy; Romance; Fantasy
- Written by: Lee Eun-young
- Directed by: Choi Yoon-suk; Lee Ho
- Starring: Hwang Jung-eum; Yoon Hyun-min; Seo Ji-hoon; Jo Woo-ri; Choi Myung-gil
- Country of origin: South Korea
- Original language: Korean
- No. of episodes: 32

Production
- Running time: 35 minutes
- Production company: iWill Media

Original release
- Network: KBS2
- Release: July 6 – September 1, 2020

Men are Men (Korean: 그놈이 그놈이다) is a 2020 South Korean television series starring Hwang Jung-eum, Yoon Hyun-min, Seo Ji-hoon, Choi Myung-gil and Jo Woo-ri. The series aired from July 6 to September 1, 2020 on KBS2.

== Synopsis ==
The leader of a webtoon planning team, Seo Hyun-ju harbors the jaded view that all men are same and has decided to remain single. Hwang Ji-woo is the CEO of Sunwoo Pharmaceutical Company. He has a cold and distant personality but excellent instinct in business. He takes an interest in Seo Hyun-ju and starts pursuing her. Park Do-gyeom is a popular webtoon writer. He is a well mannered and sociable person. He and Seo Hyun-ju grew up like siblings, but he has held a crush on Seo Hyun-ju for a long time.

== Cast ==
=== Main ===
- Hwang Jung-eum as Seo Hyun-ju
  - Joo Ye-rim as Seo Hyun-ju (child)
  - Lee Chae-yoon as Seo Hyun-ju (teen)
- Yoon Hyun-min as Hwang Ji-woo
  - Jung Ji-hoon as Hwang Ji-woo (child)
  - Bae In-hyuk as Hwang Ji-Woo (teen)
- Seo Ji-hoon as Park Do-gyeom
  - Ha Yi-ahn as Park Do-gyeom (child)
- Jo Woo-ri as Han Seo-yoon
- Choi Myung-gil as Kim Seon-hee

=== Supporting ===
==== People around Seo Hyun-ju ====
- Hwang Young-hee as Jung Young-soon, Hyun-ju's mother and Park's adopted mother
- Seo Hyun-chul as Seo Ho-joon, Hyun-ju's father and Park's adopted father
- Song Sang-eun as Kang Min-jung
- Noh Susanna as Oh Young-eun
- Kim Gyu-sun as Song Jin-ah

==== People around Hwang Ji-woo ====
- Lee Hwang-eui as Nam Yoo-cheol, Hwang Ji-woo's secretary
- Kang Ji-eun as Hwang Ji-woo's mother

==== Sunwoo Webtoon Team ====
- Han Da-sol as Kim Da-eun
- Jo Hyun-sik as Kang Eun-jae
- Hwang Man-ik as Kim Pal-do
- Baek Joo-hee as Jo Mi-ok
- Yoo Jung-rae as Hong Bo-hee

==== Mytoon Webtoon (Ep.1-3) ====
- In Gyo-jin as In Gyo-seok
- Lee Si-eon as Oh Si-eon, webtoon writer
- Lee Mal-nyeon as Writer Lee
- Joo Ho-min as Writer Joo

==== Others ====
- Kim Da-ye as Kim Su-jeong
- Lee Jung-yeol as Jung Seok-woo, Hwang Ji-woo's doctor
- Lee Hyun-kyun as Kang Min-jung's husband
- Shim Hye-yeon as Soo-bin Kang Min-jung's daughter
- Song Jin-woo as Kim Eun-beom, Song Jin-ah's ex-husband
- Kim Doh-yon as Oh Ji-hwan, Park Do-gyeom's friend and Song Jin-ah's boyfriend

=== Special appearances ===
- Son Sung-chan as Bae Jae-joon (Ep. 1)
- Ahn Se-bin as Oh Young-eun (child) (Ep. 1)
- Kang Dong-ho as Man at wedding (Ep. 1)
- Seo Yoon-hyuk as Seo Hyun-ju's classmate (Ep. 1)
- Johyun as Yu-na (Ep. 1)
- Yoon Sun-woo as Seo Hyun-ju's ex-boyfriend (Ep. 1, 2)
- Lee Jong-hyuk as Seo Hyun-ju's blind date (Ep. 3)
- Kim Jae-hwa as Butler Kim (Ep. 6)
- Lee Seon-hee as Italian Table owner (Ep. 4)
- Shin Se-hwi as You Gyo Girl, webtoon writer (Ep. 8, 10-11)
- Woo Hyun-joo as You Gyo Girl's mother (Ep. 8, 10-11)
- Jwa Chae-won as fellow student (Ep. 11,14)
- Won Jong-rye as Hwang Ji-woo's mother (dream) (Ep. 15)

== Ratings ==
- In this table, the blue numbers represent the lowest ratings and the red numbers represent the highest ratings.
- N/A denotes that the rating is not known.

Ep.	Part	Original broadcast date	Average audience share (Nielsen Korea) (Nationwide)
1	1	July 6, 2020	2.7%
1	2	July 6, 2020	3.9%
2	1	July 7, 2020	2.7%
2	2	July 7, 2020	4.4%
3	1	July 13, 2020	2.6%
3	2	July 13, 2020	3.8%
4	1	July 14, 2020	2.3%
4	2	July 14, 2020	3.3%
5	1	July 20, 2020	2.2%
5	2	July 20, 2020	3.4%
6	1	July 21, 2020	2.0%
6	2	July 21, 2020	3.3%
7	1	July 27, 2020	2.1%
7	2	July 27, 2020	3.1%
8	1	July 28, 2020	-
8	2	July 28, 2020	3.8%
9	1	August 3, 2020	2.1%
9	2	August 3, 2020	3.2%
10	1	August 4, 2020	2.2%
10	2	August 4, 2020	3.3%
11	1	August 10, 2020	2.7%
11	2	August 10, 2020	3.7%
12	1	August 11, 2020	2.3%
12	2	August 11, 2020	3.1%
13	1	August 17, 2020	1.7%
13	2	August 17, 2020	2.8%
14	1	August 18, 2020	2.1%
14	2	August 18, 2020	2.8%
15	1	August 31, 2020	2.2%
15	2	August 31, 2020	3.1%
16	1	September 1, 2020	-
16	2	September 1, 2020	3.1%
Average			N/A

== Original soundtrack ==
No.	Title	Length
1.	"Count On Me"	3:15
2.	"So Much Into You"	3:23
3.	"Still In Love"	3:43
4.	"Here I Am"	4:25
5.	"Not Clumsy Anymore"	4:16
6.	"Like The Winter That Loved Spring"	4:07
