= Seasons of Blossom (TV series) =

2022 South Korean television series

- Hangul: 청춘 블라썸
- RR: Cheongchun beullasseom
- MR: Ch'ŏngch'un pŭllassŏm
- Genre: Romance; Drama
- Based on: Seasons of Blossom by Hongduck
- Written by: Kim Na-neui, Park Yoon-sung
- Directed by: Wang Hye-ryung
- Starring: Seo Ji-hoon; So Ju-yeon; Kim Min-kyu-V; Kang Hye-won; Yoon Hyun-soo; Oh Yu-jin-III; Seo Ji-soo
- Country of origin: South Korea
- Original language: Korean
- No. of episodes: 16

Original release
- Network: Wavve
- Release: September 21 – November 2, 2022

Seasons of Blossom (Korean: 청춘 블라썸) is a 2022 South Korean television series based on the webtoon of the same name published in 2020, the series aired on September 21 to November 2, 2022 on Wavve.

== Cast ==
=== Main ===
- Seo Ji-hoon as Lee Ha-min
- So Ju-yeon as Han So-mang
- Kim Min-kyu-V as Lee Jae-min
- Kang Hye-won as Yoon Bo-mi
- Yoon Hyun-soo as Choi Jin-yeong
- Oh Yu-jin-III as Kang Seon-hee
- Seo Ji-soo as Ji-seon

=== Minors ===
- Song Ye-bin
- Hong Dong-young as Young Lee Jae-min
- Joo Byung-ha as Tae-seok
- Kwon Ye-eun as Young Kang Seon-hee
- Jang Ga-hyun as Choi Yoon-jeong
- Kang Sung-hoon-I as Homeroom teacher
- Oh Ga-bin as Jo Gyoo-ri
- Jeong Yu-hyeon as Sin Yoo-kyeong
- Shin Jun-hang
- Kim Tae-jung-I
- Kang Pil-jun as Go Joo-yeong
- Choi Rak-yeong as Sin Yoeng-seob - High school student
- Lee Jae-sung-I
