= Seo Ji-hoon (actor) =

South Korean actor (born 1997)

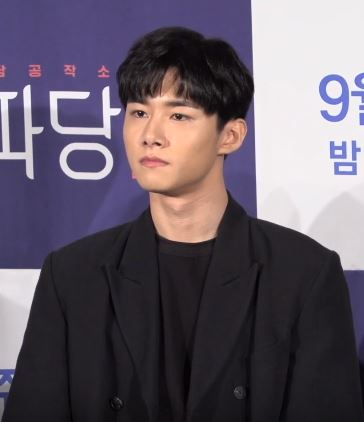
- Seo in 2019
- Born: April 25, 1997 (age 29); Daegu, South Korea
- Occupation: Actor
- Years active: 2016–present
- Agent: Management Koo

Korean name
- Hangul: 서지훈
- Hanja: 徐志焄
- RR: Seo Jihun
- MR: Sŏ Chihun

Seo Ji-hoon (born April 25, 1997) is a South Korean actor. Since his acting debut with Signal in 2016, Seo has appeared in dramas such as Solomon's Perjury (2016–2017), School 2017 (2017), My First Love (2018), and Revenge of Others (2022).

== Career ==
Seo debuted as an actor in 2016, which he took a minor role in the drama Signal as the main culprit in the Inju female student case. Then he was cast in the web-drama Matching! Boys Archery. Seo received his first KBS Drama Award nomination for his role in the one-act drama The Legendary Shuttle. Later that year he starred in the mystery teen drama Solomon's Perjury.

In 2017, Seo starred in the teen drama School 2017, and featured in the black comedy series Prison Playbook.

In 2018, Seo was cast in the fantasy romance drama My First Love as the younger version of Lee Jung-shin's character. He then played the younger version of the character Im Tae-kyung in the mystery drama Misty. In May, Seo was cast in the fantasy romance drama Tale of Fairy alongside Moon Chae-won and Yoon Hyun-min.

In 2019, Seo was cast in his first leading role in the tvN one-act drama Drama Stage: Crumbling Friendship. The same year, Seo was cast in the youth historical drama Flower Crew: Joseon Marriage Agency.

In 2020, Seo starred in the romantic comedy Men Are Men alongside Hwang Jung-eum and Yoon Hyun-min. He won a KBS Drama Award for his roles in Welcome and Men Are Men.

== Filmography ==
=== Television series ===
Year	Title	Role	Ref.
2016	Signal	Jang Tae-jin (ep.14)	
2016	KBS Drama Special: "The Legendary Shuttle"	Jo Tae-woong	
2016	Solomon's Perjury	Bae Joon-young	
2017	School 2017	Yoon Kyung-woo	
2017	Prison Playbook	Min-sik	
2018	My First Love	Kang Shin-woo (young)	
2018	Misty	Ha Myung-woo (young)	
2018	Tale of Fairy	Kim Geum	
2019	Drama Stage: "Crumbling Friendship"	Kim Young-hoon	
2019	Flower Crew: Joseon Marriage Agency	Lee Soo	
2020	Welcome	Lee Jae-sun	
2020	Men Are Men	Park Do-gyum	
2021	Imitation	Yoon Bin (ep. 8)	
2023	Payback: Money and Power	Cha Dong-jin (ep. 10–11)	
2023	My Lovely Liar	Lee Kang-min	
2024	The Midnight Studio	Yoon So-myeong (ep. 5–6)	
2025	My Youth	Kim Seok-ju	

=== Web series ===
Year	Title	Role	Ref.
2016	Matching! Boys Archery	Yoo Ji-wan	
2017	A Special Meal of the Weirdo 'Nara'	Ko Shi-saeng	
2022	Seasons of Blossom	Lee Ha-min	
2022	Revenge of Others	Seok Jae-beom	
2024	Begins ≠ Youth	Kim Hwan	
2024	Tarot	Jae-yoon	
2024	The Destiny Changer	Geum Tae-yeong	

== Awards and nominations ==
Name of the award ceremony, year presented, category, nominee of the award, and the result of the nomination
Award ceremony	Year	Category	Nominee / Work	Result	Ref.
KBS Drama Awards	2016	Excellence Award, Actor in a One-Act/Special/Short Drama	The Legendary Shuttle	Nominated	
KBS Drama Awards	2020	Best New Actor	Welcome; Men Are Men	Won	
