= Seasons of Blossom =

South Korean webtoon

- Cover art of the print edition (volume 1)

청춘 블라썸 RR: Cheongchun beullasseom MR: Ch'ŏngch'un pŭllassŏm
- Genre: Drama; Coming-of-age; Young adult
- Author: Hongduck
- Illustrator: Nemone
- Webtoon service: Naver Webtoon (Korean); Line Webtoon (English)
- Original run: June 26, 2020 – March 31, 2023
- Volumes: 12
- Anime television series
- Directed by: Byun Young-kyu; Won Hye-min
- Written by: Jeong Yu-ri; Lee Ah-yeon
- Studio: Xtorm
- Original network: KBS2
- Original run: April 15, 2026 – present
- Episodes: 1

Seasons of Blossom (Korean: 청춘 블라썸; lit. 'Youth Blossom') is a South Korean manhwa released as a webtoon, written by Hongduck and illustrated by Nemone. It has been serialized via Naver Corporation's webtoon platform Naver Webtoon from June 26, 2020 to March 31, 2023, with the individual chapters collected and published into twelve volumes.

A live-action adaptation of the series aired from September 21 to November 2, 2022 on Wavve. A South Korean animation adaptation of the series by Xtorm is currently airing, starting on April 15, 2026.

In its original webtoon edition, it is a tetralogy with each part referencing one of the four temperate seasons (spring, summer, autumn and winter), featuring the stories of teenagers and young adults who experienced the tumultuous age of youthhood.

The sequel manhwa series, Seasons of Lovesome (Korean: 청춘 러브썸; RR: Cheongchun reobeusseom; lit. 'Youth Lovesome'), was launched on Webtoon in August 2024.

== Plot ==
Seasons of Blossom tells the story of various teenagers and young adults who experience the tumultuous age of youthhood—dealing with matters such as young romance, friendship, the cost of tiger parenting, bullying and mental health. The plot of this manhwa is laid out in four parts, each representing one of the four temperate seasons.

=== Act 1: Bo-mi's Flower (Spring) ===
Set in spring at Cheongseom High School, Part 1 centers on an 18-year-old girl named Yoon Bo-mi who is conflicted between her crush on Lee Jae-min and her friendship with Kang Sun-hee. Upon knowing that Sun-hee harbors feelings for Jae-min, Bo-mi chooses to preserve her friendship with Sun-hee and forces herself into a fake relationship with their standoffish classmate Choi Jin-young. But she is unsuspecting of the romance that will soon blossom between her and Jin-young.

=== Act 2: Ha-min's Flower (Summer) ===
After the events of Part 1, Lee Jae-min runs into the 24-year-old painter Han So-mang, who is an acquaintance of Jae-min's late elder brother Lee Ha-min from six years ago at Cheongseom High School. Jae-min agrees to be So-mang's model for her artworks in return for telling him anything she can recall about Ha-min. Gradually breaking inside, he struggles with coming to terms with the bitter truth of Ha-min's untimely death.

=== Act 3: Ga-eul's Flower (Autumn) ===
Set in Cheongna University in the following autumn, Part 3 centers on 24-year-old college student Jin Ga-eul, who apparently confesses her feelings to a man named Kang Soo-bin. However, she has an ulterior motive—in reality and detests him for being involved, with her being a victim of bullying back in high school. Realizing that Soo-bin neither recognizes her nor remembers what had happened to her, Ga-eul plans to exact her revenge on him by approaching him to make him fall for her.

=== Act 4: Dong-chae's Flower (Winter) ===
Returning to Cheongseom High School and set in the following winter, Act 4 focuses on the constant suffering of 18-year-old boy Park Dong-chae who is being terribly bullied by Cha Woo-jae and his gang. As Dong-chae's tormentors gradually drive him over the edge, his 16-year-old younger sister Park Eun-chae secretly sets out to save him from further bullying, asking her crush Lee Jae-min for help. Despite being initially hesitant, Jae-min is reminded of his late elder brother Ha-min's death and joins Eun-chae in stopping the abuse and violence before it is too late.

=== Seasons of Lovesome ===
The high school cast returns, now as freshmen in university, developing their relationships further and building more connections in Café Blossom.

== Media ==
=== Manhwa ===
Initially serialized via Naver Corporation's webtoon platform Naver Webtoon from June 26, 2020 to March 31, 2023, Seasons of Blossom has been published in print from April 20, 2022 to November 14, 2023 with the individual chapters of all four parts collected and published into the twelve volumes.

==== Volume list ====
No.	Korean release date	Korean ISBN
1	April 20, 2022	979-1-12-750770-1
Part 1: Bo-mi's Flower (Spring): Chapter 1 (1화); Chapter 2 (2화); Chapter 3 (3화); Chapter 4 (4화); Chapter 5 (5화); Chapter 6 (6화); Chapter 7 (7화); Chapter 8 (8화); Chapter 9 (9화); Chapter 10 (10화); Chapter 11 (11화)
2	April 20, 2022	979-1-12-750771-8
Part 1: Bo-mi's Flower (Spring): Chapter 12 (12화); Chapter 13 (13화); Chapter 14 (14화); Chapter 15 (15화); Chapter 16 (16화); Chapter 17 (17화); Chapter 18 (18화); Chapter 19 (19화); Chapter 20 (20화); Chapter 21 (21화)
3	April 20, 2022	979-1-12-750772-5
Part 1: Bo-mi's Flower (Spring): Chapter 22 (22화); Chapter 23 (23화); Chapter 24 (24화); Chapter 25 (25화); Chapter 26 (26화); Chapter 27 (27화); Chapter 28 (28화); Chapter 29 (29화); Special Chapter (특별편): Four-Panel Comic with Too Much Info (TMI 네컷만화), A Story From That One Night (그 어느 날 밤의 이야기)
4	August 31, 2022	979-1-12-750805-0
Part 2: Ha-min's Flower (Summer): Chapter 1 (1화); Chapter 2 (2화); Chapter 3 (3화); Chapter 4 (4화); Chapter 5 (5화); Chapter 6 (6화); Chapter 7 (7화); Chapter 8 (8화); Chapter 9 (9화); Chapter 10 (10화)
5	September 30, 2022	979-1-12-750816-6
Part 2: Ha-min's Flower (Summer): Chapter 11 (11화); Chapter 12 (12화); Chapter 13 (13화); Chapter 14 (14화); Chapter 15 (15화); Chapter 16 (16화); Chapter 17 (17화); Chapter 18 (18화); Chapter 19 (19화); Chapter 20 (20화)
6	September 30, 2022	979-1-12-750817-3
Part 2: Ha-min's Flower (Summer): Chapter 21 (21화); Chapter 22 (22화); Chapter 23 (23화); Chapter 24 (24화); Chapter 25 (25화); Chapter 26 (26화); Chapter 27 (27화); Chapter 28 (28화); Chapter 29 (29화); Special Chapter (특별편): Four-Panel Time Passing Comic (심심풀이 네컷만화), My Second Summer (나의 두 번째 여름)
7	August 23, 2023	979-1-12-754916-9
Part 3: Ga-eul's Flower (Autumn): Chapter 1 (1화); Chapter 2 (2화); Chapter 3 (3화); Chapter 4 (4화); Chapter 5 (5화); Chapter 6 (6화); Chapter 7 (7화); Chapter 8 (8화); Chapter 9 (9화); Chapter 10 (10화); Chapter 11 (11화)
8	August 23, 2023	979-1-12-754917-6
Part 3: Ga-eul's Flower (Autumn): Chapter 12 (12화); Chapter 13 (13화); Chapter 14 (14화); Chapter 15 (15화); Chapter 16 (16화); Chapter 17 (17화); Chapter 18 (18화); Chapter 19 (19화); Chapter 20 (20화); Chapter 21 (21화); Chapter 22 (22화); Chapter 23 (23화)
9	August 23, 2023	979-1-12-754918-3
Part 3: Ga-eul's Flower (Autumn): Chapter 24 (24화); Chapter 25 (25화); Chapter 26 (26화); Chapter 27 (27화); Chapter 28 (28화); Chapter 29 (29화); Chapter 30 (30화); Chapter 31 (30화); Chapter 32 (30화); Chapter 33 (30화); Chapter 34 (30화); Special Chapter (특별편): Four-Panel Time Passing Comic (심심풀이 네컷만화), The Story After (그 후의 이야기))
10	October 31, 2023	979-1-12-754960-2
Part 4: Dong-chae's Flower (Winter): Chapter 1 (1화); Chapter 2 (2화); Chapter 3 (3화); Chapter 4 (4화); Chapter 5 (5화); Chapter 6 (6화); Chapter 7 (7화); Chapter 8 (8화); Chapter 9 (9화); Chapter 10 (10화); Chapter 11 (11화)
11	October 31, 2023	979-1-12-754961-9
Part 4: Dong-chae's Flower (Winter): Chapter 12 (12화); Chapter 13 (13화); Chapter 14 (14화); Chapter 15 (15화); Chapter 16 (16화); Chapter 17 (17화); Chapter 18 (18화); Chapter 19 (19화); Chapter 20 (20화); Chapter 21 (21화); Chapter 22 (22화); Chapter 23 (23화)
12	November 14, 2023	979-1-12-754962-6
Part 4: Dong-chae's Flower (Winter): Chapter 24 (24화); Chapter 25 (25화); Chapter 26 (26화); Chapter 27 (27화); Chapter 28 (28화); Chapter 29 (29화); Chapter 30 (30화); Chapter 31 (31화); Chapter 32 (32화); Chapter 33 (33화); Special Chapter (특별편): Four-Panel Time Passing Comic (심심풀이 네컷만화), Her Sincerity (그녀의 진심), The Story of That Day (그날의 이야기); Epilogue: Everyone's Spring (모두의 봄)

=== Live action series ===
A South Korean live-action series based on this webtoon was released from September 21 to November 2, 2022 on Wavve.

=== Anime ===
A South Korean animation adaptation was announced to be released in the first quarter of 2024, but eventually aired its first episode on April 15, 2026 on KBS2. The series, titled Seasons of Blossom: Our Spring (Korean: 청춘블라썸: 우리의 봄; RR: Cheongchunbeullasseom: uriui bom) is produced by Xtorm, directed by Byun Young-kyu and Won Hye-min, and written by Jeong Yu-ri and Lee Ah-yeon.

==== Episodes ====
No.	Title	Original release date
1	When a Cherry Blossom Petals Fall On Your Ring Finger (Korean: 벚꽃잎이 네번째 손가락에 떨어지면; RR: beotkkonnipi nebeonjjae songarage tteoreojimyeon)	April 15, 2026
2	I Thought You Liked Me (Korean: 나는 네가 나를 좋아하는 줄 알았는데; RR: naneun nega nareul joahaneun jul aranneunde)	April 22, 2026
3	The Heart-Pounding Start of a Contract Relationship (Korean: 두근두근! 계약연애의 시작!; RR: dugeundugeun! gyeyagyeonaeui sijak!)	April 29, 2026
4	You Like Me, Don't You? (Korean: 넌 날 좋아하잖아; RR: neon nal joahajana)	May 6, 2026
5	Obstacles Make Love Burn Even Brighter (Korean: 방해물로 사랑은 더욱 불타오르는 법; RR: banghaemullo sarangeun deouk bultaoreuneun beop)	May 13, 2026
6	I Can't Believe My Heart Is Racing, Even Though The Relationship Isn't Real! (Korean: 진짜 연애도 아닌데 두근거리다니!; RR: jinjja yeonaedo aninde dugeungeoridani!)	May 20, 2026
7	Missed the Mark by a Hair's Breadth (Korean: 한 끗 차이로 어긋나다; RR: han kkeut chairo eogeunnada)	May 27, 2026
8	I Hope You Won't Get Hurt (Korean: 네가 상처받지 않기를; RR: nega sangcheobatji ankireul)	June 10, 2026
9	Why Don't You Stop Now? (Korean: 이제 그만하는 게 어때; RR: ije geumanhaneun ge eottae)	July 8, 2026
10	Mismatched Timing (Korean: 어긋나는 타이밍; RR: eogeunnaneun taiming)	July 15, 2026
