= Gugudan SeMiNa =

South Korean girl group

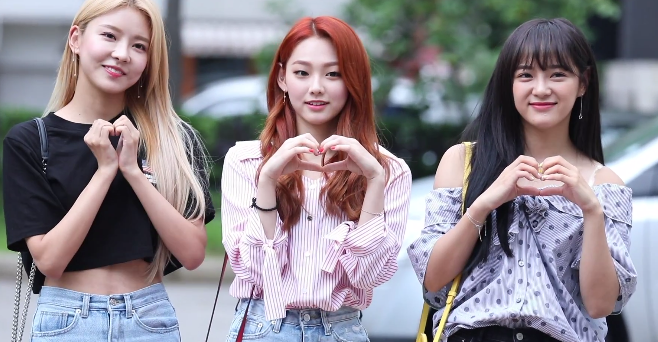
- Gugudan SeMiNa in July 2018; Left to right: Nayoung, Mina, Sejeong

Background information
- Origin: Seoul, South Korea
- Genres: K-pop; funk; blues
- Years active: 2018–2020
- Labels: Jellyfish
- Spinoff of: Gugudan
- Past members: Nayoung; Sejeong; Mina

Gugudan SeMiNa (Korean: 구구단 세미나) was the second official subgroup of South Korean girl group Gugudan, formed by Jellyfish Entertainment in 2018. It was composed of three Gugudan members: Nayoung, Sejeong and Mina.

== History ==
On June 29, Jellyfish Entertainment announced that Sejeong, Mina and Nayoung will form a unit group and release a single album on July 10. They first appeared as Jellyfish Entertainment trainees on Mnet's survival show Produce 101 with a performance of "Something New" by Nikki Yanofsky. Jellyfish Entertainment revealed they would go by the name SeMiNa, composed of the first syllables of their names Sejeong, Mina, and Nayoung. On July 10, they released a self-titled single album featuring three tracks, including the lead single "SeMiNa."

Upon the disbandment of Gugudan, the subunit disbanded on December 31, 2020.

== Members ==
- Nayoung
- Sejeong
- Mina

== Discography ==
=== Single albums ===
Title	Details	Peak positions	Sales
Title	Details	KOR	Sales
SeMiNa	Released: July 10, 2018; Label: Jellyfish Entertainment; Formats: CD, digital download; Track listing: 1. SeMiNa; 2. Ruby Heart; 3. SeMiNa (Inst.)	6	KOR: 11,225

=== Singles ===
Title	Year	Peak positions	Album
Title	Year	KOR DL	Album
"SeMiNa" (샘이나)	2018	47	SeMiNa
"—" denotes releases that did not chart or were not released in that region.

== Videography ==
=== Music videos ===
Title	Year	Director(s)	Ref.
"SeMiNa"	2018	Unknown	

== Awards and nominations ==
Name of the award ceremony, year presented, category, nominee of the award, and the result of the nomination
Award ceremony	Year	Category	Nominee / Work	Result	Ref.
Mnet Asian Music Awards	2018	Best Unit	Gugudan SeMiNa	Nominated	
