= Kang Mi-na =

South Korean actress (born 1999)

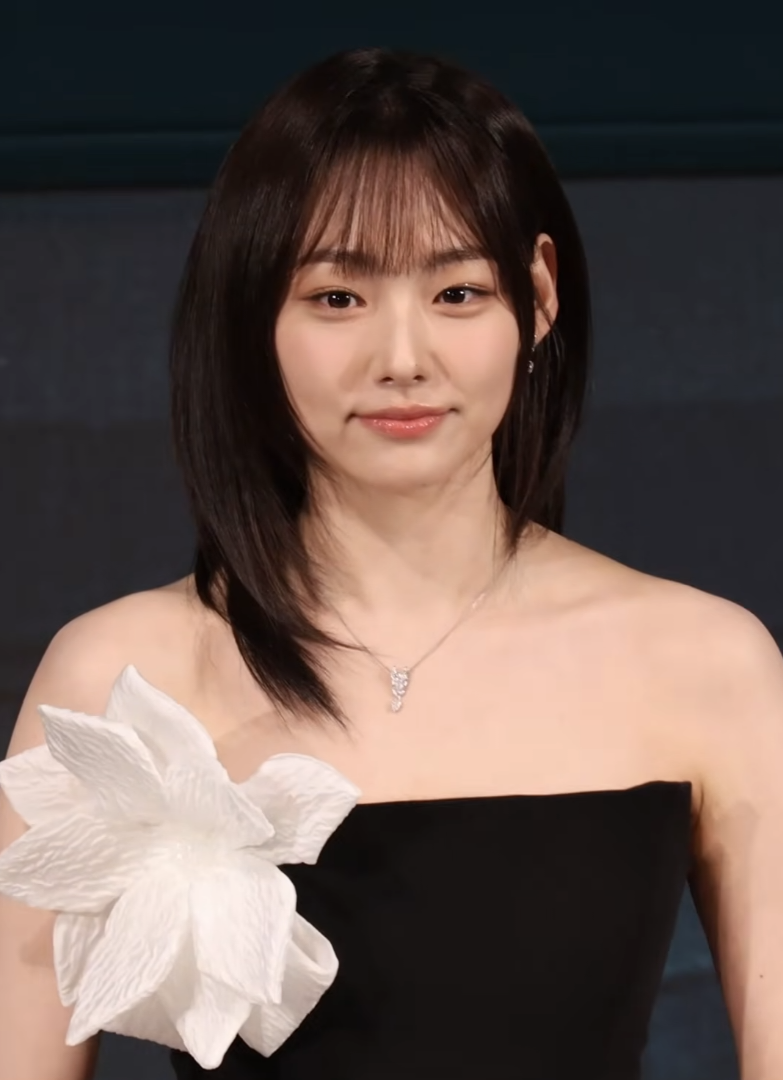
- Kang in April 2026
- Born: December 4, 1999 (age 26); Icheon, South Korea
- Education: School of Performing Arts Seoul
- Occupations: Actress; singer; rapper
- Years active: 2016–present
- Agent: Story J Company
- Awards: Full list
- Musical career
- Genre: K-pop
- Instrument: Vocals
- Years active: 2016–2020
- Labels: Jellyfish; YMC (Note: As a member of I.O.I only.); Swing; Studio Blu
- Formerly of: I.O.I; Gugudan; 5959; Gugudan SeMiNa

Korean name
- Hangul: 강미나
- Hanja: 康美娜
- RR: Gang Mina
- MR: Kang Mina
- Website: storyjcompany.com

Kang Mi-na (Korean: 강미나; born December 4, 1999), known mononymously as Mina, is a South Korean actress, singer and rapper. She is best known for finishing ninth in Mnet's K-pop girl group survival show Produce 101. She is a former member of the girl groups I.O.I and Gugudan, as well as its subgroups 5959 and SeMiNa. Kang is also best known for her roles in the television series Dokgo Rewind (2018), Tale of Fairy (2018), Hotel del Luna (2019), Summer Guys (2021), Moonshine (2021–2022), Café Minamdang (2022), Welcome to Samdal-ri (2023), and See You at Work Tomorrow! (2026).

== Early life ==
Kang Mi-na was born in Icheon, and later moved to Jeju City when she was eight years old. She graduated from School of Performing Arts Seoul in 2018.

== Career ==
=== 2016–2017: Produce 101, I.O.I and Gugudan ===
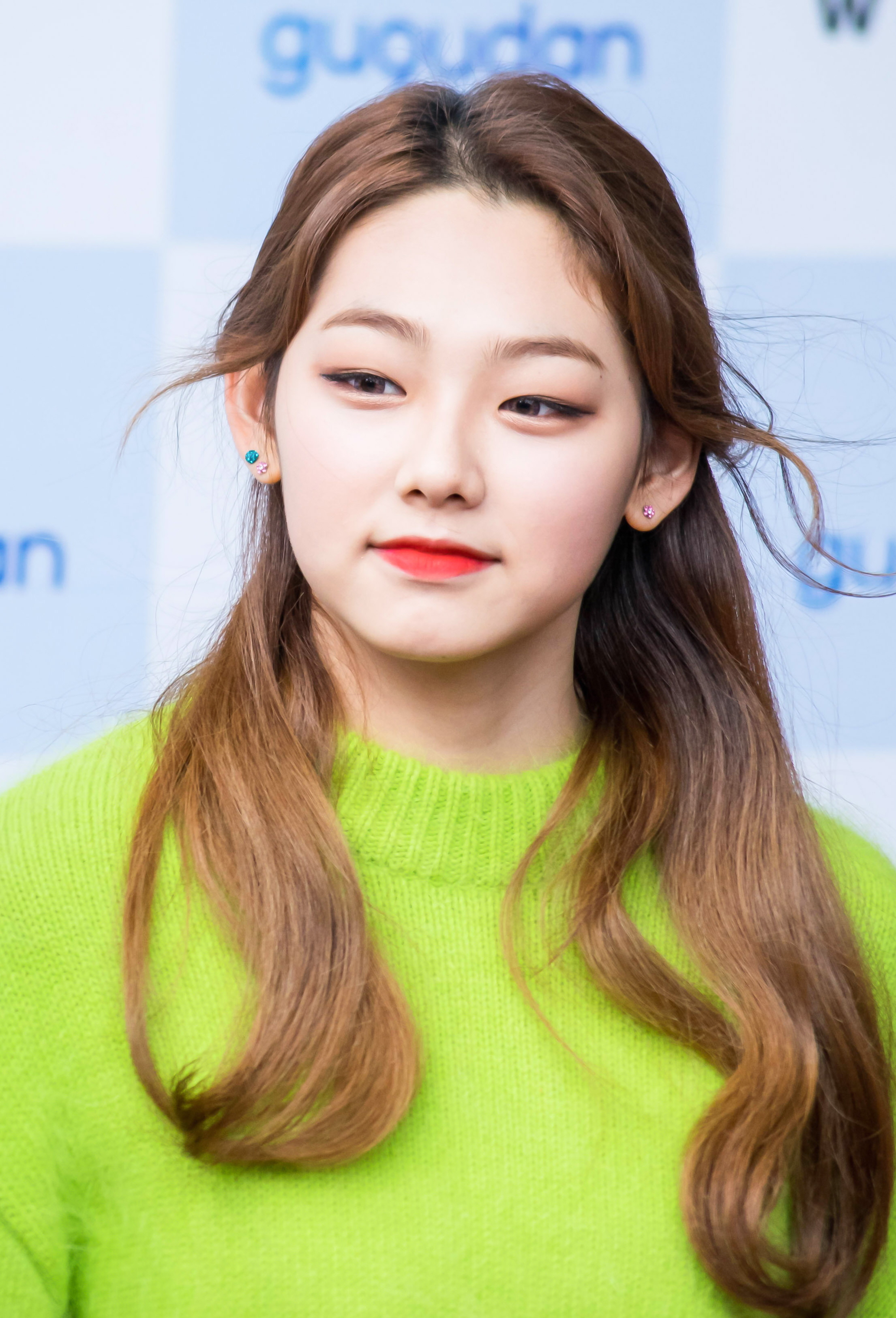
Kang in 2016

In January 2016, Kang, together with fellow trainees Kim Na-young and Kim Se-jeong, represented Jellyfish Entertainment on reality girl group survival show Produce 101 for the chance to debut in a Mnet girl group.

The program came to an end on April 1, 2016, and the final line-up of South Korean girl group I.O.I was announced, made up of the top 11 poll-winners. Kang finished ninth overall, with 173,762 votes, becoming an official member of the girl group.

On June 10, 2016, YMC Entertainment revealed that Kang would not be taking part in I.O.I's unit promotions, but would instead return to her agency to debut and promote with upcoming South Korean girl group, Gugudan.

In July 2017, a Gugudan subgroup named Gugudan 5959 was formed with Kang and fellow member Hye-yeon. They debuted with the single "Ice Chu" on August 10, 2017.

In June 2018, a Gugudan subgroup named Gugudan SeMiNa was formed with Kang and members Sejeong and Nayoung. They debuted with the release of their self-titled single album on July 10, 2018.

=== 2018–present: Acting career ===
Kang made her acting debut in the MBC romantic comedy series Children of the 20th Century in 2017, playing the younger counterpart of Han Ye-seul's character. The same year, she played her first lead role in the 2-episode tvN drama History of Walking Upright.

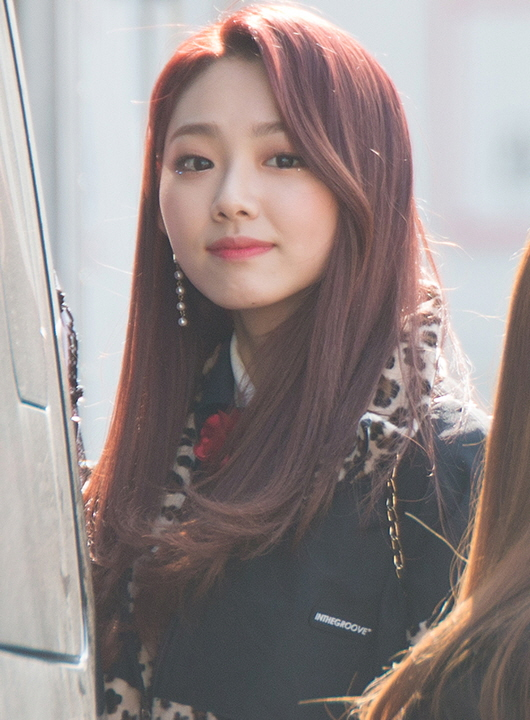
Kang in March 2018

In 2018, Kang began hosting the music program Show! Music Core. She then starred in the action web film Dokgo Rewind alongside Sehun of Exo, and played a supporting role in tvN fantasy romance drama Tale of Fairy.

In March 2019, Kang was confirmed as part of the cast for Law of the Jungle in Thailand. The same year, Kang played Kim Yuna in tvN fantasy drama Hotel del Luna.

In 2021, Kang was cast in the web drama Summer Guys which premiered on March 30. In June 2021, Kang made a cameo appearance in tvN fantasy-romance drama My Roommate Is a Gumiho. Later the same year, she starred in the KBS2 historical drama Moonshine as Han Ae-jin, the only daughter of a noble family. In 2022, she was cast in Café Minamdang as Nam Hye-joon.

On June 28, 2023, it was announced that Kang had departed from Jellyfish Entertainment after her contract expired. On July 3, Kang signed with Story J Company. Later that year she played Cho Hae-dal in the drama Welcome to Samdal-ri alongside Shin Hye-sun.

In 2025, she appeared in the fantasy action superhero drama Twelve.

== Discography ==
=== Soundtrack appearances ===
Title	Year	Album
"Peach Paradise" (계룡선녀전)	2018	Tale of Fairy OST Part 2

== Filmography ==
=== Film ===
Key
†	Denotes films that have not yet been released

Year	Title	Role	Notes	Ref.
2022	Midnight Horror: Six Nights	Soo-hyun	Segment: "Convenience Store"	
2023	Usury Academy	Da-young		
2025	Love Untangled	Go In-jeong		

=== Television series ===
Key
†	Denotes television productions that have not yet been released

Year	Title	Role	Notes	Ref.
2017	Children of the 20th Century	Sa Jin-jin (young)		
2017	Drama Stage – "History of Walking Upright"	Mi-na	One-act drama	
2018	Tale of Fairy	Jum Soon-yi		
2019	Hotel del Luna	Jung Soo-jung / Kim Yoo-na		
2021	My Roommate Is a Gumiho	Jin-ah	Cameo	
2021–2022	Moonshine	Han Ae-jin		
2022	Café Minamdang	Nam Hye-joon		
2023–2024	Welcome to Samdal-ri	Cho Hae-dal		
2024	Drama Special – "Youngbok, Sachiko"	Koo Young-bok	One-act drama	
2025	Twelve	Kang-ji		
2026	If Wishes Could Kill	Lim Na-ri		
2026	See You at Work Tomorrow!	Yoon No-ah		

=== Web series ===
Year	Title	Role	Ref.
2018	Dokgo Rewind	Kim Hyun-sun	
2021	Summer Guys	Oh Jin Dal-rae	

=== Television shows ===
Year	Title	Role	Notes	Ref.
2016	Produce 101	Contestant	Survival show that determined I.O.I members Finished 9th	
2018–2020	Show! Music Core	Host		
2019	Law of the Jungle in Thailand	Cast member		

=== Music video appearance ===
Year	Song Title	Artist	Ref.
2017	"Someone to Love"	Honeyst	

== Awards and nominations ==
Name of the award ceremony, year presented, category, nominee of the award, and the result of the nomination
Award ceremony	Year	Category	Nominee / Work	Result	Ref.
APAN Star Awards	2024	Best New Actress	Welcome to Samdal-ri	Won	
KBS Drama Awards	2022	Best New Actress	Moonshine and Café Minamdang	Won	
MBC Entertainment Awards	2018	Rookie Award – Music & Talk	Show! Music Core	Won	
MBC Entertainment Awards	2019	Female Excellence Award – Music & Talk	Show! Music Core	Nominated	
