= Act. 4 Cait Sith =

2018 single album by Gugudan

Single album by Gugudan
- Released: February 1, 2018
- Recorded: 2017–2018
- Genre: K-pop; electronic; R&B
- Length: 14:19
- Label: Jellyfish; CJ E&M
- Producer: Erik Lidbom; MELODESIGN; JQ; Mola

Gugudan chronology
Act. 3 Chococo Factory (2017)	Act. 4 Cait Sith (2018)	Act. 5 New Action (2018)

Singles from Act. 4 Cait Sith
- 1. "The Boots" Released: February 1, 2018

Act. 4 Cait Sith is the second single album by South Korean girl group Gugudan. It was released on February 1, 2018, by Jellyfish Entertainment and distributed by CJ E&M. This marks the last release to feature member Hyeyeon.

== Background and release ==
On January 15, 2018, it was reported by Jellyfish Entertainment that Gugudan would make a return with nine members. In November 2017, member Soyee had gone on hiatus in order to fully recover from a shoulder injury that she had since prior to her debut. On January 18, the title of their second single album was revealed to be Act. 4 Cait Sith. From January 19–22, Gugudan shared an image teaser through their official SNS channels featuring the nine members wearing black dresses and another teaser image wearing white dresses. On January 24 at midnight KST, Gugudan released "Waltz A Cappella", a teaser video for the title track, "The Boots". The same day, they also released a dance teaser for "The Boots" featuring member Hyeyeon. The title track, "The Boots", was released on January 31.

On January 25, Jellyfish Entertainment revealed that Gugudan's single album was pushed back, and would instead be released February 1. The next day, at midnight KST, the release schedule was revealed along with the track list which contained four songs.

The release date was inevitably changed in order to perfect the album and for the final quality of the music and music video.

—Jellyfish Entertainment regarding the delay.

== Promotion ==
The group held comeback stages on February 1 on M! Countdown, followed by performances on February 2–4 on Music Bank, Show! Music Core, and Inkigayo, respectively.

== Track listing ==
No.	Title	Lyrics	Music	Arrangement	Length
1.	"The Boots"	JQ; Mola	Erik Lidbom; MELODESIGN	Erik Lidbom	3:21
2.	"Silly"	Music Cube	Kristine Lind; Becky Jerams; youwhich	youwhich	4:00
3.	"Lovesick"	danke	Albi Albersson; Caroline Gustavsson; Nana Larsen	MUSSASHI	3:37
4.	"The Boots" (Instrumental)		Erik Lidbom; MELODESIGN		3:21
Total length:					14:27

== Charts ==
Chart (2018)	Peak position
South Korean Albums (Gaon)	7

== Release history ==
Region	Date	Format	Label
Worldwide	February 1, 2018	Digital download	Jellyfish Entertainment; CJ E&M Music
South Korea	February 1, 2018	CD, music download	Jellyfish Entertainment; CJ E&M Music
