= Act. 3 Chococo Factory =

2017 single album by Gugudan

Single album by Gugudan
- Released: November 8, 2017
- Genre: K-pop
- Length: 14:36
- Label: Jellyfish; CJ E&M

Gugudan chronology
Act. 2 Narcissus (2017)	Act. 3 Chococo Factory (2017)	Act. 4 Cait Sith (2018)

Singles from Act. 3 Chococo Factory
- 1. "Chococo" Released: November 6, 2017

Act. 3 Chococo Factory is the debut single album by South Korean girl group Gugudan, released on November 8, 2017 by Jellyfish Entertainment and distributed by CJ E&M. It was their first release as an eight-member group, since member Soyee was on hiatus for recovering from a shoulder injury that she had since prior to her debut.

== Background and release ==
Jellyfish Entertainment announced that Gugudan have a comeback on November 8, 2017 with eight members due to member Soyee recovering from a shoulder injury. On October 25, it was confirmed that the release of Gugudan's first single album, Act 3: Chococo Factory, with the title track "Chococo", would be released on November 8. The concept for Act. 3 Chococo Factory was inspired by Charlie and Chocolate Factory.

On October 26, Gugudan shared an image teaser through their official SNS channels featuring the eight members wearing bright red outfits and appear to be posing in various parts of a chocolate making factory. The next day, Gugudan shared their group's concept image teaser featuring the members wearing bright red outfits posed in chocolate factory and in another teaser showed four members wearing bright blue outfits.

On October 28, Gugudan shared the tracklist of their upcoming single album will be consists of four tracks: the title track, "Chococo" alongside the instrumental, and two other new songs, "Lucky" and "Snowball".

On November 1, it was revealed that the single album had two versions. The normal version consists of a booklet, two photo cards, a poster, and a special, limited "golden ticket" that would only be included in 100 albums. The KIHNO version was features a "kihno kit", special packaging, and 10 photo cards. On the same day, Gugudan released a highlight medley. On November 2, they shared a choreography spoiler.

The first music video teaser of "Chococo" was released on November 6. The single album, along with the music video of the title track, was officially released on the 8th at 18:00 KST. It was also released as a digital download on various music sites.

== Promotion ==
Gugudan held a media event at Yes24 Live Hall in Gwangjang-dong, Seoul before the release of the single album.

The group held their comeback stage on the November 9 episode of M Countdown, followed by performances on the November 10, 11 and 12 episodes of Music Bank, Show! Music Core and Inkigayo, respectively.

== Commercial performance ==
Act. 3 Chococo Factory debuted at number 8 on Gaon Album Chart on the chart issue dated November 5–11, 2017.

The title track, "Chococo", debuted at number 98 on the Gaon Digital Chart on the chart issue dated November 5–11, 2017 with 17,775 downloads sold at number 85 on the Gaon Download Chart.

== Track listing ==
No.	Title	Lyrics	Music	Arrangement	Length
1.	"Chococo"	Cho Yun-kyung; Dohoon Kim; Yong Bae	MELODESIGN; Jan Hyoty; Eeva Louhivuori	Jan Hyoty	3:41
2.	"Lucky"	Bead	Erik Lidbom	Erik Lidbom	3:05
3.	"Snowball" (스노우 볼)	Zhang Xinjin	Gen Neo; Andreas Oberg; Maria Marcus	Gen Neo	4:05
4.	"Chococo" (Instrumental)		MELODESIGN; Jan Hyoty; Eeva Louhivuori		3:41
Total length:					14:36

== Charts ==
Chart (2017)	Peak position
South Korea (Gaon Album)	8

== Release history ==
Region	Date	Format	Label
Worldwide	November 8, 2017	Digital download	Jellyfish Entertainment, CJ E&M Music
South Korea	November 8, 2017	CD, music download	Jellyfish Entertainment, CJ E&M Music
