= My First Love (TV series) =

2018 South Korean television series

- Promotional poster
- Hangul: 애간장
- Lit.: Longing Heart
- RR: Aeganjang
- MR: Aeganjang
- Genre: Fantasy; Romantic comedy
- Based on: Longing Heart by Kim Hee-ran and Kim Byung-gwan
- Written by: Park Ga-yeon
- Directed by: Min Yeon-hong
- Starring: Lee Jung-shin; Seo Ji-hoon; Lee Yul-eum
- Country of origin: South Korea
- Original language: Korean
- No. of episodes: 10

Production
- Executive producer: Kim Yong-jin
- Running time: 45 minutes
- Production company: SBS Plus

Original release
- Network: OCN
- Release: January 8 – February 6, 2018

My First Love (Korean: 애간장; RR: Aeganjang) is a 2018 fantasy South Korean television series starring Lee Jung-shin, Seo Ji-hoon and Lee Yul-eum. It is based on the webtoon by the same title, released in 2015. It aired on OCN from January 8 to February 6, 2018, every Monday and Tuesday at 21:00 (KST) for ten episodes.

== Synopsis ==
The story of a man who cannot forget his first love from ten years ago and is given the chance to redo history as he returns to the past.

== Cast ==
=== Main ===
- Lee Jung-shin as Kang Shin-woo (28 years old), a high school mathematics teacher who, by an accidental opportunity, returns to ten years in the past and meets his younger self.
- Seo Ji-hoon as young Kang Shin-woo (18 years old)
- Lee Yul-eum as Han Ji-soo, Shin-woo's first love, a pretty and smart student who hides an inner pain from childhood.

=== Supporting ===
- Kim Sun-young as Shin-woo's mother
- Cho Seung-hee as Baek Na-hee
- Park Han-sol as Kim Yun-jeong
- Kim Min-seok as Kim Min-seok
- Min Do-hee as Jang So-ra
- Lee Joo-hyung as Joo Geun-deok
- Song Ji-hyun as Kang Shin-hee
- Lee Sang as Ki-wan
- Go Gyu-pil
- Lee Tae-sun as Shin Joo-hwan

== Production ==
- The series marks the three main actors' first-ever lead role.
- It was initially planned by SBS Plus, the production company of the series, to air My First Love on their network, but later moved to OCN. There was also a plan to stream it first on the Oksusu app before the broadcast.
- The first script reading of the cast took place at SBS Prism Tower in Sangam-dong.
- It was fully pre-produced: filming started in late August 2017 and wrapped up on October 25.

== Ratings ==
Average TV viewership ratings (nationwide)
Ep.	Original broadcast date	TNmS
1	January 8, 2018	0.3%
2	January 9, 2018	0.3%
3	January 15, 2018	0.3%
4	January 16, 2018	0.3%
5	January 22, 2018	0.4%
6	January 23, 2018	0.2%
7	January 29, 2018	0.1%
8	January 30, 2018	0.2%
9	February 5, 2018	0.1%
10	February 6, 2018	0.2%
Average		0.2%
In the table above, the blue numbers represent the lowest ratings and the red numbers represent the highest ratings.; This series aired on a cable channel/pay TV which normally has a relatively smaller audience compared to free-to-air TV/public broadcasters (KBS, SBS, MBC and EBS).
