= Act. 2 Narcissus =

2017 extended play by Gugudan

EP by Gugudan
- Released: February 27, 2017
- Recorded: 2016–2017
- Genre: K-pop
- Length: 20:27
- Language: Korean
- Labels: Jellyfish; CJ E&M
- Producers: Maria Marcus; Chowool; Ravi; PUFF; Glory Face; Jinli; MELODESIGN

Gugudan chronology
Act. 1 The Little Mermaid (2016)	Act. 2 Narcissus (2017)	Act. 3 Chococo Factory (2017)

Singles from Act. 2 Narcissus
- 1. "A Girl Like Me" Released: February 27, 2017

Act. 2 Narcissus is the second extended play by South Korean girl group Gugudan. It was released on February 27, 2017, by Jellyfish Entertainment and distributed by CJ E&M. A music video for the title track "A Girl Like Me", was also released on February 27.

The EP was a commercial success, debuting at number 3 on the Gaon Album Chart.

== Background and release ==
On January 20, 2017, it was reported that Gugudan was set for a February comeback. On February 3, 2017, Jellyfish Entertainment announced that Gugudan would make their first comeback since debut with their second mini-album, on February 28.

On February 15, 2017, Jellyfish Entertainment released a teaser announcing the titles for the mini-album Act. 2 Narcissus and the title track "A Girl Like Me". On February 16, 2017, Jellyfish Entertainment released the comeback schedule and individual teaser images for Mimi, Hana and Nayoung. On February 17, 2017, Jellyfish Entertainment released individual teaser images for Hyeyeon, Mina and Sally. On February 18, 2017, Jellyfish Entertainment released individual teaser images for Sejeong, Soyee and Haebin. On February 19, 2017, a group teaser image and the album cover were revealed.

On February 20, 2017, it was revealed that their label-mate VIXX's Ravi had written one of the album's songs for the group. On February 21, 2017, the album tracklist composed of five songs, as well as the highlight medley were revealed.

On February 24, 2017, Jellyfish Entertainment released the first MV teaser and announced that the release of the album was changed to February 27. A series of performance spoilers of each member showing some dance moves were also released. On February 26, 2017, Jellyfish Entertainment released the second MV teaser which preview a little of the choreography.

== Promotion ==
The music video for the title track "A Girl Like Me", was released on February 27, 2017, in conjunction with the EP. Gugudan held a live showcase on February 28.

== Commercial performance ==
Act. 2 Narcissus debuted at number 3 on Gaon Album Chart on the chart issue dated February 26 – March 4, 2017.

The title track, "A Girl Like Me", debuted at number 38 on the Gaon Digital Chart on the chart issue dated February 26 – March 4, 2017, with 49,829 downloads sold.

== Track listing ==
Digital download

No.	Title	Lyrics	Music	Arrangement	Length
1.	"Rainbow"	Jang Yeojin; An Yeongju	Erik Lidbom; Maria Marcus	Erik Lidbom	3:36
2.	"A Girl Like Me" (나 같은 애; Na gat-eun ae)	Chowool	Chowool	Chowool	2:55
3.	"Hate You" (미워지려 해; Miwojilyeo hae)	Ravi (VIXX)	Ravi; PUFF	Ravi; PUFF	3:11
4.	"One Step Closer" (거리; Geoli)	Jinli; Glory Face	Glory Face; Jinli	Glory Face; Mingki (RBW)	3:48
5.	"Make a Wish" (소원 들어주기; Sowon deul-eojugi)	Kim Ji-hyang	MELODESIGN	MELODESIGN	4:02
6.	"A Girl Like Me" (Instrumental)		Chowool	Chowool	2:55
Total length:					20:50

== Charts ==
Chart (2017)	Peak position
South Korea (Gaon Album)	3

== Release history ==
Region	Date	Format	Label
Worldwide	February 27, 2017	Digital download	Jellyfish Entertainment, CJ E&M Music
South Korea	February 27, 2017	CD, music download	Jellyfish Entertainment, CJ E&M Music
