= Act. 5 New Action =

2018 extended play by Gugudan

EP by Gugudan
- Released: November 6, 2018
- Recorded: 2018
- Genre: K-pop
- Length: 20:47
- Language: Korean
- Labels: Jellyfish; CJ E&M

Gugudan chronology
Act. 4 Cait Sith (2018)	Act. 5 New Action (2018)

Singles from Act. 5 New Action
- 1. "Not That Type" Released: November 6, 2018

Act. 5 New Action is the third and final extended play by South Korean girl group Gugudan. It was released on November 6, 2018 by Jellyfish Entertainment and distributed by CJ E&M. A music video for the title track "Not That Type", was also released on November 6. It marked the group's only record as an eight-member group since the departure of member Hyeyeon in October 2018 and their last before their disbandment on December 31, 2020.

== Background and release ==
On October 27, Gugudan announced that they'll be returning on November 6 with their third mini album "Act.5 New Action." Their colorful first teaser photo includes member Kang Mina blowing a bubble with bubblegum. It was released on November 6, 2018. For their new concept, the group shared that they were inspired by the movie Ocean's 8.

== Promotion ==
On November 6, Gugudan held a showcase at the Yes24 Live Hall for their comeback.

== Track listing ==
Digital download

No.	Title	Lyrics	Music	Arrangement	Length
1.	"Not That Type"	Jam Factory; Music Cube	Erik Nyholm; Jessica Jean Pfeiffer	Erik Nyholm	3:12
2.	"Be Myself"	Inner child (MonoTree)	Inner child (MonoTree); PUFF	PUFF	3:01
3.	"Dear" (너에게)	Sejeong	Erik Lidbom; Gifty Dankwah	Erik Lidbom	3:53
4.	"Shotgun"	박소현	Paul Najjar; Ylva Dimberg	Paul Najjar	2:57
5.	"Do It"	Ravi	Ravi; PUFF	Ravi; PUFF	3:17
6.	"Pastel Sweater"	Kim Ji-hyang	Erik Lidbom; MLC	Erik Lidbom	4:25
Total length:					20:47

== Charts ==
Chart (2017)	Peak position
South Korea (Gaon Album)	8

== Release history ==
Region	Date	Format	Label
Worldwide	November 6, 2018	Digital download	Jellyfish Entertainment, CJ E&M Music
South Korea	November 6, 2018	CD, music download	Jellyfish Entertainment, CJ E&M Music
