= Gugudan =

South Korean girl group

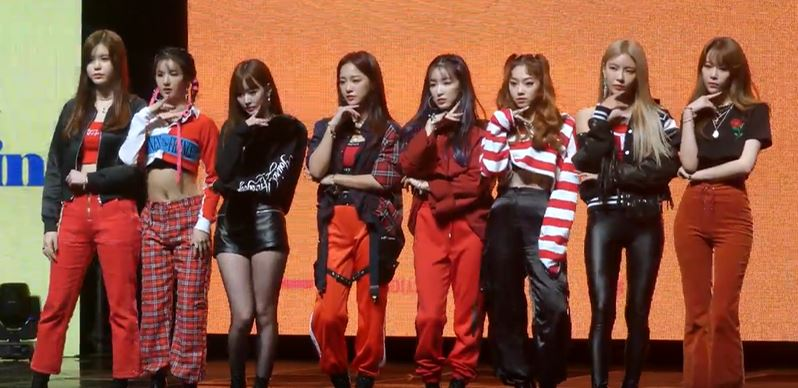
- Gugudan at Act. 5 New Action showcase From left to right: Soyee, Sally, Mimi, Sejeong, Hana, Mina, Nayoung, and Haebin.

Background information
- Origin: Seoul, South Korea
- Genres: K-pop; synth-pop
- Years active: 2016–2020
- Label: Jellyfish
- Spinoffs: Gugudan 5959; Gugudan SeMiNa
- Past members: Mimi; Hana; Haebin; Nayoung; Sejeong; Sally; Soyee; Mina; Hyeyeon
- Website: Official Website

Korean name
- Hangul: 구구단
- Hanja: 九九段
- RR: Gugudan
- MR: Kugudan

Gugudan (Korean: 구구단), also stylized as gu9udan or gx9, was a South Korean girl group formed in 2016 by Jellyfish Entertainment and the company's first girl group. The group debuted on June 28, 2016, with their EP Act. 1 The Little Mermaid. The group was composed of eight members: Mimi, Hana, Haebin, Nayoung, Sejeong, Sally, Soyee, Mina, and previously Hyeyeon until her departure from the group in October 2018.

Following two years with very little group activities, Gugudan disbanded on December 31, 2020.

== History ==
=== Pre-debut ===
In January 2016, Nayoung, Sejeong and Mina were introduced as Jellyfish Entertainment's first female trainees on the Mnet survival show, Produce 101, where 101 female trainees from various companies competed to debut in an eleven-member girl group that would promote for a year under YMC Entertainment. After placing 2nd and 9th respectively in the final episode, Sejeong and Mina debuted as members of I.O.I in May 2016.

=== 2016: Debut with Act. 1 The Little Mermaid ===
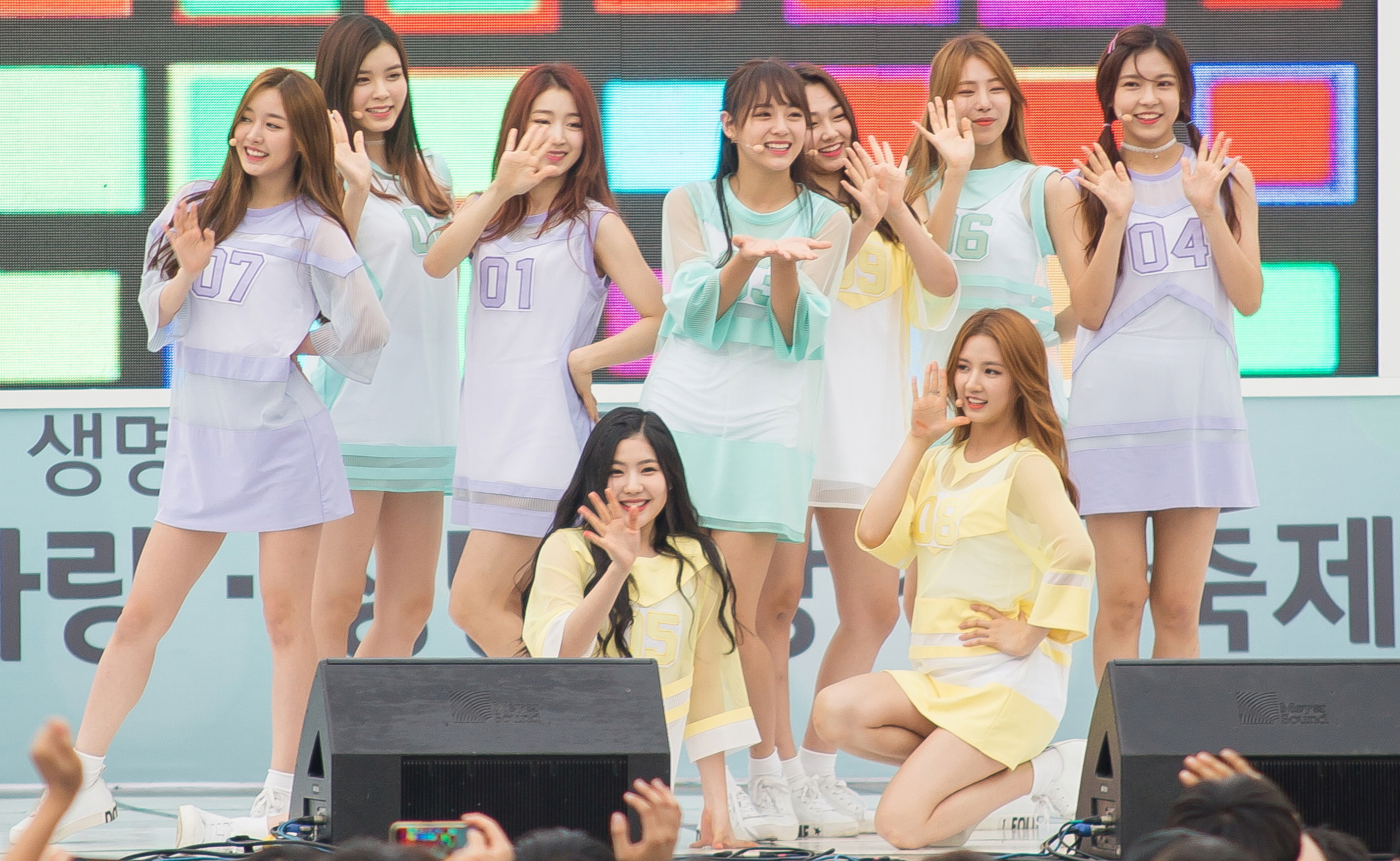
Gugudan in September 2016

Despite denying earlier reports of Sejeong and Mina debuting in a 3-member girl group in June, Jellyfish Entertainment confirmed on June 7 that the two I.O.I members would debut within the month in what would be the company's first girl group. Because of YMC Entertainment's special terms in which I.O.I's members are allowed to do activities under their respective companies while I.O.I was on break or while the group promoted in sub-units, there were no complications with the plan.

Nayoung was also confirmed as a member on June 10 and on June 13, Jellyfish Entertainment revealed that Gugudan would be a nine-member group. On June 17, Jellyfish Entertainment announced the group name.

On June 22, the group confirmed that they were going for a "mermaid" concept. Following the announcement, a highlight medley of the group's debut mini-album was released on June 24. They debuted on June 28, 2016, with the mini-album, Act. 1 The Little Mermaid, with "Wonderland" as the title song. Their debut showcase was held at the Yes24 Live Hall on the same day as the album's release.

Gugudan participated in Jellyfish Entertainment's annual winter project, Jelly Christmas 2016, with their label mates Seo In-guk, VIXX, Park Yoon-ha, Park Jung-ah, Kim Gyu-sun, Kim Ye-won and Jiyul. The title track, "Falling (니가 내려와)" was released digitally on December 13, 2016.

=== 2017: Act. 2 Narcissus and Act. 3 Chococo Factory ===
Their second mini-album, Act. 2 Narcissus, and its title track, "A Girl Like Me", was released on February 27.

On November 8, the group released a single album, Act. 3 Chococo Factory, featuring the title track, "Chococo". Prior to the release, it was announced that Soyee will go on hiatus in order to fully recover from a shoulder injury that she had since prior to her debut.

=== 2018: Act. 4 Cait Sith, Act. 5 New Action, Japanese debut and Hyeyeon's departure ===
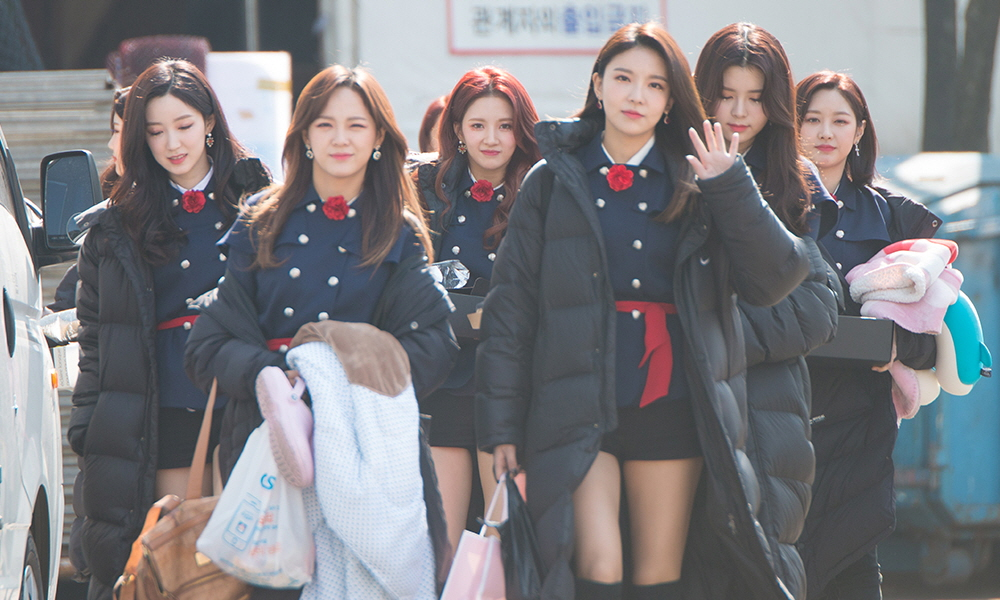
The group in March 2018

On February 1, Gugudan released their second single album Act. 4 Cait Sith, with the lead single "The Boots".

On May 17, it was announced that youngest member Hyeyeon would go on a temporary hiatus from all the group activities due to health issues.

Gugudan officially debuted in Japan with a release of their first Japanese single Stand By on September 19. On September 21, Gugudan held their debut showcase and fanmeeting titled Gugudan 1st Showcase ＆ Fanmeeting "Dear Friend" in Japan at Tokyo Akasaka Blitz. The group also held their first Japan tour in Osaka and Tokyo starting on December 7, 2018.

Hyeyeon left the group for personal reasons in October 2018.

On November 6, Gugudan released their third EP, Act. 5 New Action, containing six tracks with the lead single "Not That Type".

=== 2020: Sally's participation in Produce Camp 2020 and disbandment ===
In April 2020, Chinese member Sally participated in the Chinese survival show Produce Camp 2020. The survival show concluded with Sally ranking sixth, making her a member of the temporary girl group BonBon Girls 303.

On December 30, Gugudan had announced their disbandment. Their final schedule was completed on December 31, 2020.

== Members ==
- Mimi (미미) — vocalist
- Hana (하나) — leader, dancer, vocalist
- Haebin (해빈) — vocalist
- Nayoung (나영) — vocalist
- Sejeong (세정) — vocalist
- Sally (샐리) — dancer, rapper, vocalist
- Soyee (소이) — vocalist
- Mina (미나) — rapper, dancer, vocalist
- Hyeyeon (혜연) — dancer, vocalist, rapper

== Subunits ==
=== Gugudan 5959 ===
In July 2017, Jellyfish Entertainment formed the subunit group named Gugudan 5959 (Korean: 구구단 오구오구; spelled as "Ogu-ogu"), composed of the youngest members Mina and Hyeyeon. The "5959" name is made up of their represented numbers in Gugudan: Hyeyeon representing the number 5 and Mina representing the number 9. 5959 released their debut single, "Ice Chu", on August 10, 2017.

After Hyeyeon's departure in October 2018, the subunit consequently became inactive.

=== Gugudan SeMiNa ===
In June 2018, Jellyfish Entertainment formed the second subunit of Gugudan, composed of members Sejeong, Mina and Nayoung, named Gugudan SeMiNa (Korean: 구구단 세미나). The "SeMiNa" name is made up of the first syllables of the members' names. Gugudan SeMiNa debuted with the release of their self-titled single album consisting of two tracks on July 10, 2018.

== Discography ==
=== Single albums ===
List of single albums, with selected details and chart positions
Title	Details	Peak chart positions	Sales
Title	Details	KOR	Sales
Act. 3 Chococo Factory	Released: November 8, 2017 (KOR); Label: Jellyfish Entertainment; Formats: CD, digital download	8	KOR: 20,435
Act. 4 Cait Sith	Released: February 1, 2018 (KOR); Label: Jellyfish Entertainment; Formats: CD, digital download, SMC	7	KOR: 20,933

=== Extended plays ===
List of extended plays, with selected chart positions and sales
Title	Details	Peak chart positions			Sales
Title	Details	KOR	JPN	JPN Hot	Sales
Act. 1 The Little Mermaid	Released: June 28, 2016 (KOR); Label: Jellyfish Entertainment; Formats: CD, digital download	2	—	—	KOR: 22,217
Act. 2 Narcissus	Released: February 27, 2017 (KOR); Label: Jellyfish Entertainment; Formats: CD, digital download	3	—	—	KOR: 29,207; JPN: 223
Stand By	Released: September 19, 2018 (JPN); Label: Jellyfish Entertainment Japan; Formats: CD, digital download	—	47	63	JPN: 1,442
Act. 5 New Action	Released: November 6, 2018 (KOR); Label: Jellyfish Entertainment; Formates: CD, digital download	8	—	—	KOR: 9,813
"—" denotes releases that did not chart or were not released in that region.

=== Singles ===
List of singles, with selected chart positions, showing year released and album name
Title	Year	Peak chart positions		Sales (DL)	Album
Title	Year	KOR	KOR Hot	Sales (DL)	Album
"Wonderland"	2016	35	—N/a	KOR: 116,908	Act. 1 The Little Mermaid
"A Girl Like Me" (나 같은 애)	2017	38	—N/a	KOR: 70,060	Act. 2 Narcissus
"Chococo"	2017	— (Note: "Chococo" peaked at number 98 on the Domestic Gaon Digital Chart.)	—	KOR: 17,196	Act. 3 Chococo Factory
"The Boots"	2018	— (Note: "The Boots" did not enter on the Digital Chart but appeared at number 48 on the Download Chart.)	100	—N/a	Act. 4 Cait Sith
"Not That Type"	2018	— (Note: "Not That Type" peaked at number 85 on the Download Chart.)	—	—N/a	Act. 5 New Action
"—" denotes releases that did not chart or were not released in that region.

=== Collaborations ===
Title	Year	Peak chart position	Other artist(s)	Sales (DL)	Album
Title	Year	KOR	Other artist(s)	Sales (DL)	Album
"Falling" (니가 내려와)	2016	34	Seo In-guk, VIXX, Park Yoon-ha, Park Jung-ah, Kim Gyu-sun, Kim Ye-won, Jiyul	KOR: 64,663	Jelly Christmas 2016
"—" denotes releases that did not chart or were not released in that region.

=== Soundtrack appearances ===
Title	Year	Member(s)	Album
"Perhaps Love" (사랑일 것 같더라)	2017	All	Story About: Some, One Month Episode 1
"Believe in This Moment" (이 순간을 믿을게)	2017	All	School 2017 OST
"Diary (2001 Remix Ver.)" (일기)	2017	Mimi, Hana, Nayoung, Mina	Children of the 20th Century OST

== Videography ==
=== Music videos ===
Title	Year	Director(s)	Ref.
"Wonderland"	2016	Zanybros	
"A Girl Like Me" (나 같은 애)	2017	Digipedi	
"Chococo"	2017	Digipedi	
"The Boots"	2018	Purple Straw Film	
"Not That Type"	2018	August Frog	—N/a

== Filmography ==
=== Television ===
- Gugudan Project: Extreme School Trip (MBC Music; 2016)

=== Web Show ===
- What Are Gugudan Doing? (vLive & YouTube; 2016–2020)

== Concert and tours ==
- Gugudan 1st Showcase ＆ Fanmeeting "Dear Friend" in Japan (2018)
- Gugudan 1st Japan Tour "Play" (2018)
- Gugudan "1st Asia Tour" (2018)

== Awards and nominations ==
Name of the award ceremony, year presented, category, nominee of the award, and the result of the nomination
Award ceremony	Year	Category	Nominee / Work	Result	Ref.
Asia Artist Awards	2016	Popularity Award (Singer)	Gugudan	Nominated	
Asia Artist Awards	2017	Rising Star Award	Gugudan	Won	
Asia Artist Awards	2017	Popularity Award (Singer)	Gugudan	Nominated	
Asia Artist Awards	2018	Popularity Award (Singer)	Gugudan	Nominated	
Asia Artist Awards	2018	New Wave Award (Music)	Gugudan	Won	
Gaon Chart Music Awards	2017	New Artist of the Year	Gugudan	Nominated	
Golden Disc Awards	2017	. New Artist of the Year	Gugudan	Nominated	
Golden Disc Awards	2017	Popularity Award	Gugudan	Nominated	
Golden Disc Awards	2017	Asian Choice Popularity Award	Gugudan	Nominated	
Korean Culture and Entertainment Awards	2017	K-Pop Award	Gugudan	Won	
Mnet Asian Music Awards	2016	Best New Artist (Female Group)	Gugudan	Nominated	
Mnet Asian Music Awards	2016	Artist of the Year	Gugudan	Nominated	
Rookie Asia M-style Show	2016	Cultural Technology – Awesome Style Award	Gugudan	Won	
Seoul Music Awards	2017	Bonsang Award	Gugudan	Nominated	
Seoul Music Awards	2017	New Artist Award	Gugudan	Nominated	
Seoul Music Awards	2017	Popularity Award	Gugudan	Nominated	
Seoul Music Awards	2017	Hallyu Special Award	Gugudan	Nominated	
Seoul Music Awards	2018	Bonsang Award	Gugudan	Nominated	
Seoul Music Awards	2018	Popularity Award	Gugudan	Nominated	
Seoul Music Awards	2018	Hallyu Special Award	Gugudan	Nominated	
Soribada Best K-Music Awards	2017	Performance Award	Gugudan	Won	
Soribada Best K-Music Awards	2017	Popularity Award	Gugudan	Nominated	
