= Act. 1 The Little Mermaid =

2016 extended play by Gugudan

EP by Gugudan
- Released: June 28, 2016
- Recorded: 2016
- Genre: K-pop
- Length: 20:41
- Language: Korean
- Label: Jellyfish; CJ E&M

Gugudan chronology
Act. 1 The Little Mermaid (2016)	Act. 2 Narcissus (2017)

Singles from Act. 1 The Little Mermaid
- 1. "Wonderland" Released: June 28, 2016

Act. 1 The Little Mermaid is the debut extended play by South Korean girl group Gugudan. It was released digitally and physically on June 28, 2016, by Jellyfish Entertainment and distributed by CJ E&M.

== Background and release ==
On June 13, 2016, Jellyfish Entertainment launched the band's official website and announced via SNS that the group would debut with the mini-album Act. 1: The Little Mermaid and title-track "Wonderland".

Teasers featuring each of the members for their music video were released from June 14 to 16th. On June 28, the song's music video were released online and through Naver's V App.

The EP was released on June 28, 2016, on Melon and various sites in South Korea and on iTunes for the global market as a digital download.

== Promotion ==
The music video for the title track "Wonderland", was released on June 28, 2016, in conjunction with the EP and accumulates over 2 million views. Gugudan held a live showcase on June 28.

On June 29, the group made their official debut on MBC Music's Show Champion performing "Good Boy" and "Wonderland".

== Commercial performance ==
Act. 1 The Little Mermaid entered and peaked at number 2 on the South Korean Gaon Album Chart on the chart issue dated June 26 – July 2, 2016. In its third week, the EP re entered the Top 10 at number 8. The EP also charted at number 8 on Gaon Album Chart for the month of June 2016 with 12,839 copies sold.

The title track "Wonderland" entered and peaked at number 38 on the South Korean Gaon Digital Chart on the chart issue dated June 26 – July 2, 2016 with 55,887 downloads sold and 703,642 streams.

== Track listing ==
No.	Title	Lyrics	Music	Length
1.	"Wonderland"	ButterFly; Jang Yeon-jung; Kim In-hyung	ButterFly	3:05
2.	"Could This Be Love" (구름 위로; Gureum Wiro)	Misfit	Simon Janlöv; Andreas Oberg; Kanata Okajima	3:14
3.	"Good Boy"	Kim Chang-rak; Mario; Han Kyung-su	Kim Chang-rak; Park Su-seok; Lee Hyun-sang	2:54
4.	"Diary" (일기; Ilgi)	Jin-ri; Glory Face	Glory Face; Jin-ri; Ming-ki	3:38
5.	"Maybe Tomorrow"	Kim Ji-hyang	MELODESIGN	4:48
6.	"Wonderland" (instrumental)		ButterFly	3:05
Total length:				20:41

== Charts ==
=== Weekly charts ===
Chart (2016)	Peak position
South Korean Albums (Gaon)	2

=== Monthly charts ===
Chart (2016)	Peak position
South Korean Albums (Gaon)	8

== Release history ==
Region	Date	Format	Label
Worldwide	June 28, 2016	Digital download	Jellyfish Entertainment, CJ E&M Music
South Korea	June 28, 2016	CD, music download	Jellyfish Entertainment, CJ E&M Music
Taiwan	June 29, 2016	Digital download	Avex Taiwan Inc.
