= Plant (disambiguation) =

A plant is a kingdom of mainly multicellular, predominantly photosynthetic eukaryotes.

Plant or planted may also refer to:

== Heavy industry and engineering ==
- Plant (control theory), the combination of process and actuator
- Chemical plant
- Heavy equipment
- Manufacturing plant
- Physical plant, a facility's infrastructure
- Power plant

== Arts, entertainment, and media ==
- The Plant (film), a British television movie
- The Plant (novel), an unfinished serial novel by Stephen King
- Music industry plant, a pejorative
- The Plant (newspaper)
- Plant (professional wrestling)
- "The Plant" (Schitt's Creek)
- "Plants" (Life), BBC documentary episode
- "Plant" (song)
- The Plants, musical group
- "A.K.A. The Plant" (Weeds episode)
- Planted, cookbook by Chantelle Nicholson
- PLANT, fictional organization in Mobile Suit Gundam SEED and related media

== People with the name ==
- Caleb Plant (born 1992), American professional boxer
- Henry B. Plant (1819–1899), American railroad manager
- Joe-Warren Plant (born 2002), English actor
- John Plant (disambiguation), multiple people
- Linda Plant (born 1952), English businesswoman
- Richard Plant (disambiguation), multiple people
- Robert Plant (born 1948), lead singer of Led Zeppelin
- Thomas Gustave Plant (1859–1941), British-American manufacturer
- Tom Plant (Colorado politician)
- William Plant (disambiguation), multiple people
- Plant, member of Italian band La Sad

== Other uses ==
- Plant, Arkansas, U.S.
- Plant (restaurant)
- Plant (snooker)
- Frameup
- A shill
- Plant, role in Team Role Inventories

== See also ==
- Plante (disambiguation)
- La Plant, South Dakota, U.S.
- Laplante (disambiguation), a surname
