= John McSweeney =

John McSweeney may refer to:

- John McSweeney (Ohio politician) (1890–1969), American member of the House of Representatives from Ohio
- John McSweeney (Maine politician) (1923–1995), member of the Maine House of Representatives
- John M. McSweeney (1916–1979), American diplomat
- John Zewizz (born 1955), né John McSweeney, American industrial music performer
- John McSweeney Jr., Academy Award for Best Film Editing for the 1962 film Mutiny on the Bounty
- John McSweeney (lawyer), see 1880 Democratic National Convention

== See also ==
- John MacSween (disambiguation)
