= Plante =

Plante or Planté is a surname. Notable people with the surname include:

- Ada May Plante (1875–1950), New Zealand artist
- Alex Plante (born 1989), Canadian hockey player
- Alicia Plante (born 1939), Spanish writer
- Arthur Plante (1869–1927), Canadian lawyer and politician
- Bill Plante (1938–2022), American journalist
- Brian Plante (born 1956), American science fiction writer
- Cam Plante (born 1964), Canadian former hockey player
- Dan Plante (born 1971), Canadian former National Hockey League player
- David Plante (born 1940), American novelist
- Derek Plante (born 1971), hockey coach and retired National Hockey League player
- Francis Planté (1839–1934), French pianist
- Franciscus Plante (1613–1690), Dutch poet
- Gaston Planté (1834–1889), French physicist who invented the lead-acid battery
- Jacques Plante (1929–1986), Canadian ice hockey goaltender
- Jean-François Plante, Canadian politician
- Jerome Plante (1935–2025), American politician
- Joseph-Bernard Planté (1768–1826), notary and politician in Lower Canada
- Max Plante (born 2006), American ice hockey player
- Pacifique Plante (died 1976), Canadian corruption-fighting lawyer
- Pierre Plante (born 1951), Canadian retired hockey player
- Thomas G. Plante, American psychologist
- Tyler Plante (born 1987), Canadian hockey player
- Vincent Planté (born 1980), French football goalkeeper

== See also ==
- Laplante (surname), also La Plante
- Plant (disambiguation), includes a list of people with the surname Plant
