= Plant man =

Plant man or variation, may refer to:

== People ==
- Plantsman or plantman, a plant nursery worker
- Gardener or plant man
- Horticulturalist or plant man
- Botanist or plant man
- Factory worker or plant man, a worker at a plant

=== Persons ===
- A man by the name of "Plant"
- Greg Morton (born 1953), U.S. American football player with a horticultural passion leading to the nickname "Plant Man"
- Gary Young (drummer) (born 1953), U.S. musician with the stagename "Plantman"

== Characters ==
- Plantman, a Marvel Comics character
- Plant Man, a character from Mega Man; see List of Mega Man characters
- Plant Man, a character from the TV cartoon Frankenstein Jr. and The Impossibles

== Other uses ==
- The Plantsman, a horticultural magazine
- "The Plant Man" (episode), a 1966 season 3 number 12 episode 70 of Voyage to the Bottom of the Sea (TV series)
- "Plant Man", a 2008 episode of The Marvelous Misadventures of Flapjack; see List of The Marvelous Misadventures of Flapjack episodes

== See also ==
- Plant (disambiguation)
- Man (disambiguation)
