= Plante (disambiguation) =

Plante is a surname.

Plante may also refer to:

- Planté (crater), a lunar crater
- Planté cell, a type of electrochemical cell, a secondary battery of the lead-acid type

== See also ==
- Laplante (disambiguation)
- Plant (disambiguation)
