= Flower Way =

2016 single by Sejeong

Single by Sejeong

from the album Jelly Box
- Language: Korean
- Released: November 23, 2016
- Genre: K-pop; Ballad
- Length: 3:57
- Label: Jellyfish; Stone Music
- Composer: Zico
- Lyricist: Zico

Sejeong singles chronology
"Flower Way" (2016)	"If Only" (2017)

Music video
- "Flower Way (Jellyfish)" on YouTube "Flower Way (Stone)" on YouTube

"Flower Way" (Korean: 꽃길; RR: Kkotgil), also known as "Flower Road", is a song by South Korean singer Sejeong released on November 22, 2016, by Jellyfish Entertainment and distributed by Stone Music Entertainment. The track was a promotional tool for Jellyfish Entertainment's digital music platform Jelly Box. "Flower Way" was placed first on the music show Show Champion on November 30, 2016.

== Background ==
"Flower Way" was initially born as an improvisation by Zico, who created the song in less than hour on the television show Talents for Sale, in which celebrities cooperate to raise funds for local charities by advertising products created based on their talents. It was first performed by Sejeong and her band-mate Jung Chae-yeon on the same show. On November 16, 2016, it was announced that Sejeong was working on finishing the song alongside Zico and would release it, alongside a music video, on November 23 through Jellyfish Entertainment's music channel project Jelly Box.

== Composition ==
"Flower Way" was written and produced by South Korean rapper Zico, who was inspired to create the song after hearing letters written by Kim Sejeong and Jung Chae-yeon, directed to their mothers. From these letters were the lyrics of the song derived. Sejeong's letter expressed her regret towards and appreciation for her mother, as well as a promise to bring her a better future.

== Commercial performance ==
"Flower Way" peaked at number two on the Gaon Digital Chart.

== Promotion ==
Sejeong had been promoting the track through a variety of music program appearances. She made her debut showcase on KBS' Music Bank on November 25.

== Track listing ==
No.	Title	Lyrics	Music	Arrangement	Length
1.	"Flower Way" (꽃길)	Zico	Zico	Zico; Poptime	3:57
2.	"Flower Way (inst.)" (꽃길 (inst.))		Zico	Zico; Poptime	3:57

== Charts ==
Chart (2016)	Peak position
South Korea (Gaon)	2

== Accolades ==
Awards and nominations for "Flower Way"
Year	Award ceremony	Category	Result	Ref.
2017	Mnet Asian Music Awards	Best Vocal Performance — Female Solo	Nominated	
2017	Mnet Asian Music Awards	Song of the Year	Nominated	
2017	Melon Music Awards	Hot Trend Award	Nominated	

Music program awards
Program	Date	Ref.
Show Champion	November 30, 2016	

== Release history ==
Region	Date	Format	Label
Various	November 22, 2016	Digital download; streaming	Jellyfish Entertainment; Stone Music Entertainment
