= Laplante =

Laplante may refer to:

- Laplante (surname)
- LaPlante, New Brunswick, Canada, settlement
- La Plant, South Dakota, U.S., census-designated place
- La Plant-Choate, a company acquired by Allis-Chalmers in 1952

== See also ==
- Plante (disambiguation)
