= Lil Boi =

South Korean rapper (born 1991)

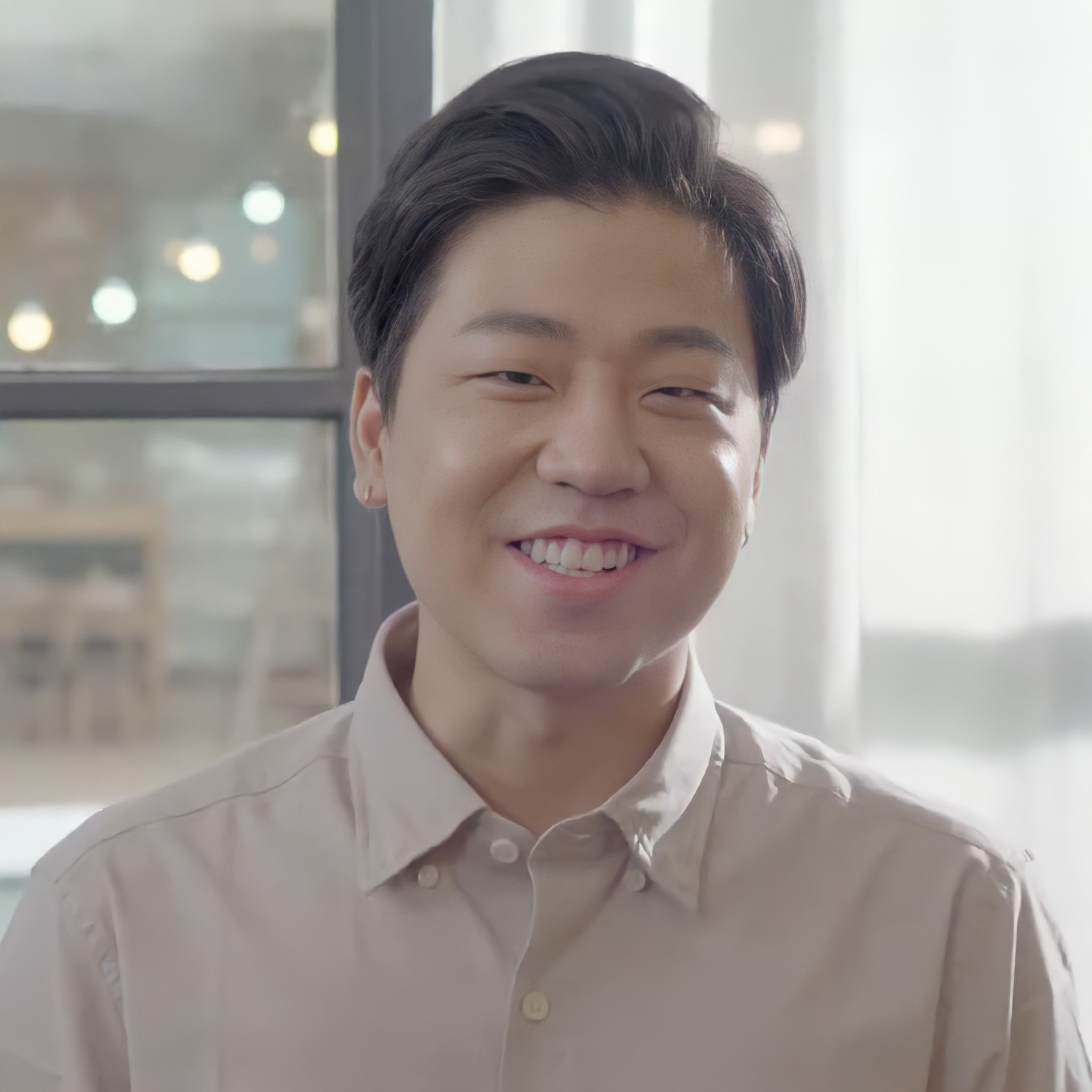
- Lil Boi in 2017
- Born: June 7, 1991 (age 35); Yeosu, South Korea
- Occupation: Rapper
- Agents: Grand Line Entertainment; How Entertainment

Korean name
- Hangul: 오승택
- Hanja: 吳昇澤
- RR: O Seungtaek
- MR: O Sŭngt'aek

Oh Seung-taek (Korean: 오승택; born June 7, 1991), better known by the stage name Lil Boi (stylised as lIlBOI; 릴보이), is a South Korean rapper. He is member of hip-hop duo Geeks. In 2020, he won Show Me the Money 9.

== Discography ==
=== Studio albums ===
Title	Album details	Peak chart positions	Sales
Title	Album details	KOR	Sales
Meantime	Released: October 19, 2022; Label: Stone Music Entertainment; Formats: CD, digital download	68	KOR: 2,245

=== Singles ===
Title	Year	Peak chart positions	Album
Title	Year	KOR	Album
"Have A Drink" (한잔해요) (with Giriboy)	2012	—	Non-album single
"Respect" (with Sik-K, Geegooin feat. Loco, Gray, DJ Pumkin)	2015	6	Show Me the Money 4
"On It + Bo$$" (with Loco, Jay Park)	2015	11	Show Me the Money 4
"Call Me" (연락해) (with Basick feat. Hwasa)	2015	26	Non-album singles
"David"	2018	—	Non-album singles
"Moves" (with Yanu, TakeOne)	2020	—	Non-album singles
"Pray" (기도) (feat. Verbal Jint, Taylor, Hoody)	2020	—	Meantime
"Freak" (with Wonstein, Chillin Homie, Skyminhyuk)	2020	8	Show Me the Money 9
"Tomorrow" (내일이 오면) (feat. Giriboy, Big Naughty)	2020	2	Show Me the Money 9
"Bad News Cypher Vol. 2" (feat. TakeOne)	2020	61	Show Me the Money 9
"On Air" (feat. Loco, Jay Park, Gray)	2020	11	Show Me the Money 9
"Credit" (feat. Yumdda, Giriboy, Zion.T)	2020	8	Show Me the Money 9
"Friends" (with Wonstein)	2021	52	Non-album singles
"Heat" (with Wonstein, Mirani)	2021	136	Non-album singles
"Refresh" (새로고침) (with TakeOne)	2022	— (Note: "Refresh" did not enter the Circle Digital Chart, but it peaked at number 199 on the component Download Chart.)	Non-album singles
Soundtrack appearances
"Wonderful Life" (with TakeOne)	2018	—	Bad Guys 2 OST
"—" denotes releases that did not chart.

=== Other charted songs ===
Title	Year	Peak chart positions	Album
Title	Year	KOR	Album
"O.M.G" (Hyolyn feat. Lil Boi)	2013	39	Love & Hate
"Some" (썸) (Soyou and Junggigo feat. Lil Boi)	2014	1	Non-album singles
"Let's Just Say We Loved" (사랑했다치자) (Seo In-young feat. Lil Boi)	2015	21	Non-album singles
"Crush On You" (처음 본 여자는 다 예뻐) (Babylon feat. Lil Boi)	2016	61	Fantasy
"Firefly" (반딧불이) (Hwang Chi-yeul and Eunha feat. Lil Boi)	2016	88	Fall, in Girl Vol. 1
"Warning" (Sejeong feat. Lil Boi)	2021	98	I'm
"Holiday" (Blase feat. Lil Boi and Giriboy)	2022	94	Show Me the Money 11 Episode 3

== Filmography ==
=== Television shows ===
Year	Title	Role
2015	Show Me the Money 4	Contestant
2016	Tribe of Hip Hop	Producer
2020	Show Me the Money 9	Contestant (Winner)
2022	Show Me the Money 11	Producer
2023	Boys Planet	Rap master (ep. 3)

== Awards and nominations ==
Awards ceremony	Year	Category	Result	Ref
Melon Music Awards	2021	Top 10	Won	
