= Charles Scontras =

American historian (1929–2021)

Charles A. Scontras (November 25, 1929 – March 7, 2021) was a Maine labor historian, educator and author.

== Personal ==
Scontras was born in Buffalo, New York, the son of Greek immigrants. He spent his childhood and adolescence in Old Orchard Beach, Maine. His mother worked in the textile mills of nearby Biddeford and his father was a shoe repairman. Prior to his career in education, he owned a shoe store and shoe repair business.

He attended the University of New Hampshire, earning a B.S. in Business Administration. He later earned a M.Ed. and a M.A. and Ph.D. in history from the University of Maine, Orono.

He lived in Cape Elizabeth, Maine, with his wife, Joanne.

== Career ==
Scontras taught at the University of Maine for 36 years, holding positions in the Modern Society, History, and Political Science Departments, and in the Honors Program. He retired in 1997, but continued to serve as a research associate at the University of Maine Bureau of Labor Education.

=== Maine Labor History Mural ===
In 1997, the Maine Department of Labor consulted with Scontras as the agency worked to commission a mural highlighting Maine's labor history. He worked closely with Judy Taylor, the artist selected for project, to identify the scenes that were captured on the eleven panel mural. Taylor honored his contribution to the work by using his image in a mural panel that depicts apprenticeship. He is shown teaching an apprentice how to hand sew shoes.

== Bibliography ==
- Organized Labor and Labor Politics in Maine, 1880-1890 (University of Maine Studies Series #2, No. 83) (1966)
- Two Decades of Organized Labor and Labor Politics in Maine, 1880-1900 (1969)
- Organized Labor in Maine: Twentieth Century Origins (1985)
- The Socialist Alternative: Utopian Experiments and the Socialist Party of Maine, 1895-1914 (1985)
- The Origins of Labor Day in Maine and Historical Glimpses of Labor in Parade in Early Nineteenth Century Maine (1989)
- Collective Efforts Among Maine Workers: Beginnings and Foundations, 1820-1880 (1994)
- Samuel Gompers and the American Federation of Labor vs. Maine’s Congressman Charles E. Littlefield: 1900-1913 (1998)
- In the Name of Humanity: Maine’s Crusade Against Child Labor (2000)
- Organized Labor in Maine: War, Reaction, Depression, and the Rise of the CIO 1914-1943 (2002)
- Time-Line of Selected Highlights of Maine Labor History: 1636-2003 (2003)
- Labor in Maine: Building the Arsenal of Democracy and Resisting Reaction at Home, 1939-1952 (2006)
- Unity in the House of Labor: Maine AFL-CIO Merger, 1956 (2006)
- Labor Day — 2007: Pausing to Reflect on Images of Maine Labor One Hundred Years Ago (2007)
- Requiem for the labor movement? : a perspective (2007)
- Time-Line of Selected Highlights of Maine Labor History: 1636-2015 (2016)
