= Kim Se-jeong =

South Korean singer and actress (born 1996)

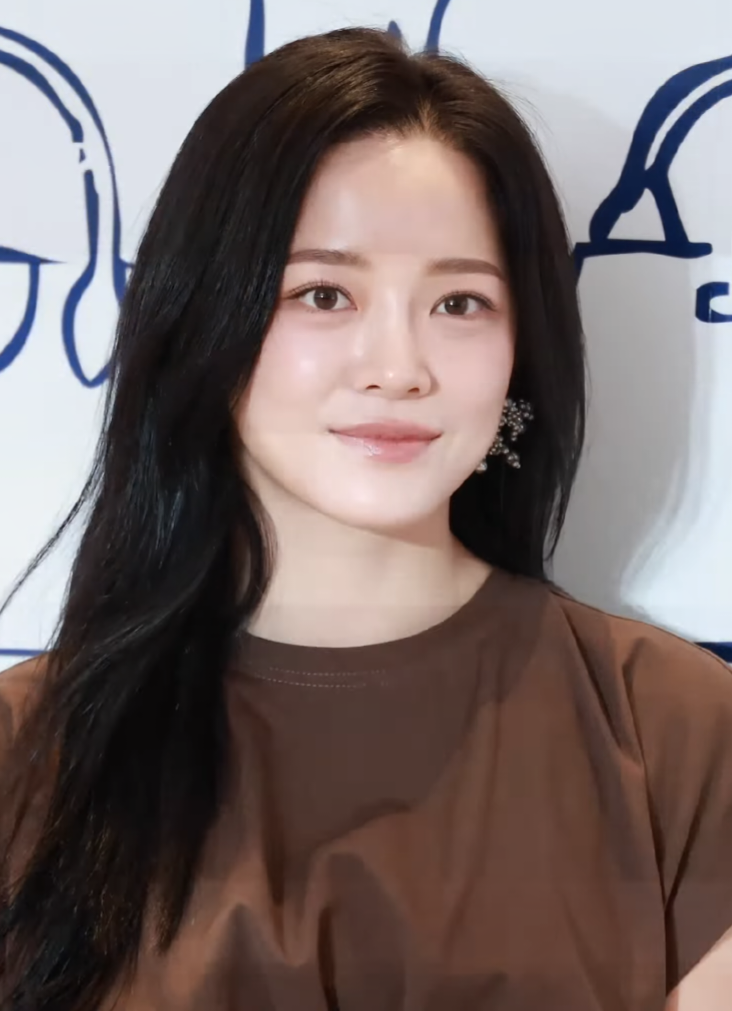
- Kim in 2025
- Born: August 28, 1996 (age 30); Gimje, South Korea
- Education: Hanyang Women's University
- Occupations: Singer; songwriter; actress
- Agent: BH Entertainment
- Awards: Full list
- Musical career
- Genre: K-pop
- Instrument: Vocals
- Years active: 2016–present
- Labels: Jellyfish; YMC (Note: As a member of I.O.I only.); Swing; Studio Blu
- Formerly of: I.O.I; Gugudan; Gugudan SeMiNa

Korean name
- Hangul: 김세정
- RR: Gim Sejeong
- MR: Kim Sejŏng

Kim Se-jeong (Korean: 김세정; born August 28, 1996) is a South Korean singer and actress. She finished second in Mnet's girl group survival show Produce 101, becoming a member of the project girl group I.O.I. She was also a member of Jellyfish Entertainment's girl group Gugudan. She is currently active as a solo artist and actress, best known for her lead roles in the television series School 2017 (2017), The Uncanny Counter (2020–2023), Business Proposal (2022), and Brewing Love (2024).

== Early life and education ==
Kim Se-jeong was born on August 28, 1996, in Gimje, North Jeolla Province, but moved to Anyang, Gyeonggi where she stayed with her mother and older brother at her aunt's house. Her parents split when she was a child, leaving her mother to single-handedly raise her and her brother. She has previously stated that she did not contact her father until she was in her third year of middle school. Before her debut, Kim participated in track and field competitions in elementary and middle school and was part of the Theatre Club in her high school. Kim passed Jellyfish Entertainment's auditions through a competition of 3,000 to 1 ratio, thus becoming a trainee. Kim studied practical music at Hanyang Women's University.

== Career ==
=== 2012–2016: First television appearances and debut with I.O.I ===
In 2012, Kim participated in the second season of competition television show K-pop Star 2 at the age of 16. She did not make it through the second round of the ranking audition, but Yang Hyun-suk brought her back as a wildcard for the casting round where Kim performed a duet of Taeyang's "I Need A Girl" with fellow contestant Jo Yoo-min. They both made it to the final casting round along with contestants Nicole Curry and Lee Soo-kyung where Kim was eliminated from the competition.

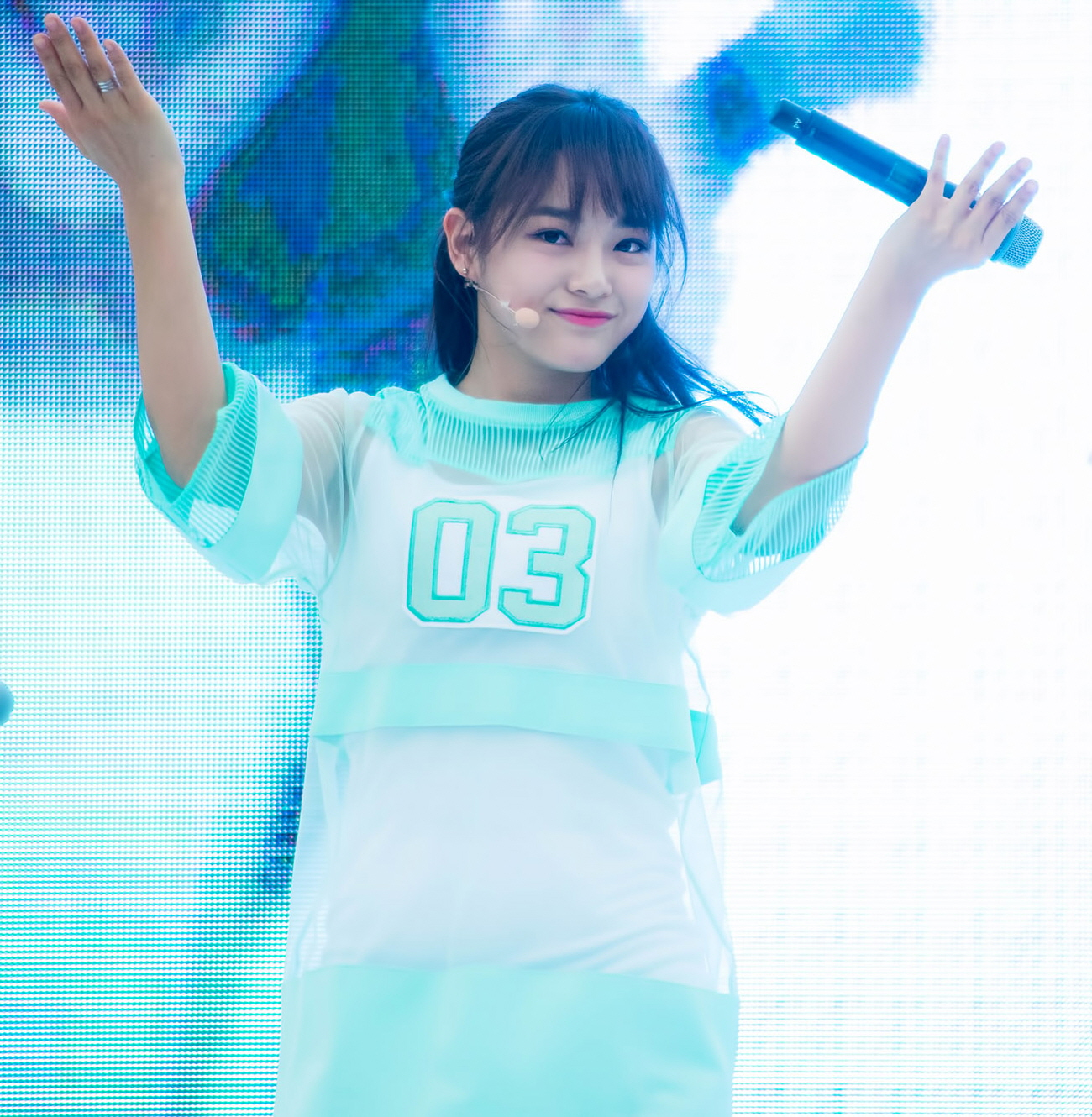
Kim performing in 2016

In January 2016, Kim represented Jellyfish Entertainment together with fellow trainees Kim Na-young and Kang Mi-na on the reality survival show Produce 101 for the chance to debut in an Mnet Project girl group. All three were assigned to "Group A" in the first episode of the program and Kim achieved the first-place ranking on several episodes. Kim was the runner-up contestant of the season, garnering 525,352 votes, officially becoming a member of the girl group I.O.I. They debuted on May 4, 2016, with the lead single "Dream Girls" from the album Chrysalis. I.O.I disbanded in January 2017 and the members returned to their respective agencies at the end of their contracts.

=== 2016–2018: Gugudan and early acting roles ===
On June 10, 2016, YMC Entertainment revealed that Kim would return to her agency to join and promote its upcoming girl group. On June 28, 2016, while still members of I.O.I, Kim and Kang Mi-na joined Gugudan with the lead single "Wonderland". On November 23, 2016, Kim participated in Jellyfish Entertainment's music channel project Jelly Box and released the single "Flower Way", produced by Zico, along with a music video. The single peaked at number two on the Gaon Digital Chart and Kim received her first solo artist music program trophy for the single on the November 30 episode of Show Champion. On January 12, 2017, Kim released the song "If Only" for the soundtrack of The Legend of the Blue Sea. Later that year, she collaborated with Lee Tae-il of Block B for the digital single "I Like You, I Don't", which charted at number 8 on the Gaon Music Charts. Kim also collaborated with NCT's Doyoung on a song titled "Star Blossom" for the SM Station Season 2 music project.

Kim hosted the new KBS show Talents for Sale alongside Kim Jong-kook, Lee Seo-jin and Noh Hong-chul in 2016. She would later get a "Rookie Variety" nomination in the 15th KBS Entertainment Awards. In March 2017, she joined the reality-documentary Law of the Jungle in Sumatra. She was awarded with a "Best Challenge" Award on the 11th SBS Entertainment Awards.

In July 2017, she took on her first major acting role as the lead character Ra Eun-ho in KBS2's teen drama School 2017 where she won the "Best New Actress" award at the 31st KBS Drama Awards. She also was a vocalist for the series' soundtrack titled "Believe in this Moment". In September 2017, she was announced to star in Netflix's first Korean variety show Busted! That month, she also starred on OnStyle's show Get It Beauty. In January 2018, Kim became the first special co-host of Baek Jong-won's Alley Restaurant.

Kim and LEO were chosen to sing the official cheer song entitled "We, the Reds" for the South Korea national football team for the 2018 World Cup Tournament. In June 2018, she was cast for tvN's sci-fi variety program Galileo: Awakened Universe, which was filmed using the Mars Desert Research Station (MDRS), the largest and longest-running Mars surface simulation facility in the world. They were the first Korean entertainment crew to set foot on the Research Station.

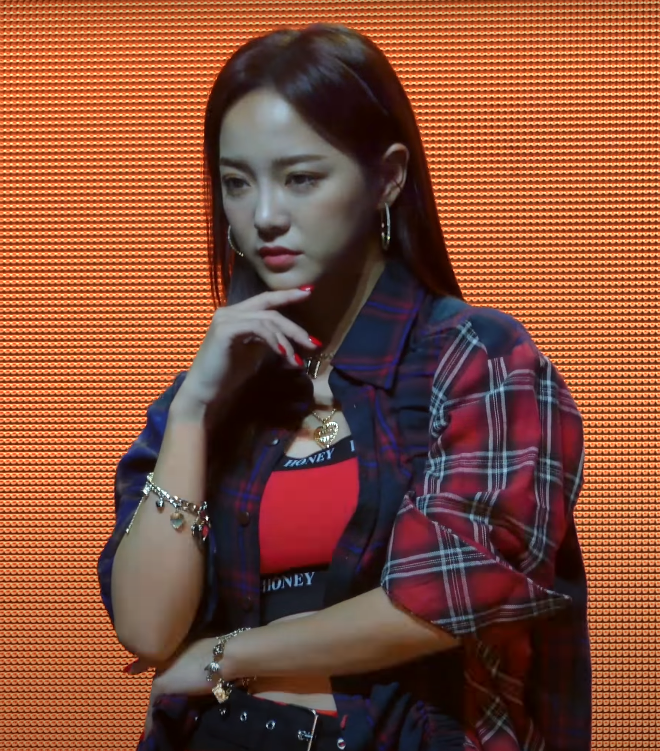
Kim promoting with Gugudan in 2018. This was the group's last comeback before their hiatus and eventual disbandment in December 2020.

In June 2018, she formed Gugudan SeMiNa with fellow Produce 101 alumni members Mina and Nayoung. They debuted on July 10, 2018, with the single "SeMiNa". In September 2018, Kim released the song "Paramour" for the Mr. Sunshine soundtrack.

=== 2019–present: Solo career, stage debut, and commercial success ===
In 2019, Kim took her second leading role in the mystery romantic-comedy drama I Wanna Hear Your Song where she played a timpanist who lost her memories due to traumatic events. She would later win the K-Drama Hallyu Star Award on the 2019 KBS Drama Awards for the role. After a year of hiatus as a singer and three years since her solo debut song, Kim released the single "Tunnel" in collaboration with Dingo Music on December 2, 2019, followed by her first self-written and composed extended play titled Plant (화분; Hwabun), with its lead single of the same name, released on March 17, 2020. She wrote and composed all the tracks from her EP, except for the lead single. She received her second music award show trophy on The Show for the single. Kim released the song "All of My Days" for the drama Crash Landing on You, which charted at number 50 on the Gaon Digital Chart, followed by "What My Heart Says" for Record of Youth. She later released the digital single "Whale" on August 17, 2020.

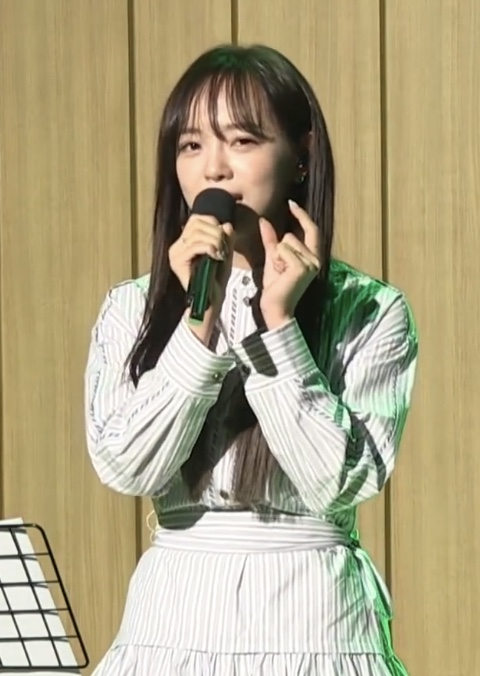
Kim in March 2020

Kim made her musical debut as the female lead in Return: The Promise of the Day, an original army musical that deals with the topic of excavating the remains of the heroic soldiers who sacrificed themselves to protect their country during the Korean War. On July 15, 2020, she was confirmed to star in The Uncanny Counter, where she played the role of Do Ha-na. The drama became the highest-rated OCN series of all time. Kim also contributed to the drama's OST through her self-written and composed song "Meet Again" which charted at 147 on the Gaon Digital chart. After two years of inactivity, on December 31, 2020, Jellyfish Entertainment disbanded Gugudan. On May 11, 2021, Kim renewed her contract with the company as a solo artist and actress.

On March 9, 2021, it was revealed that she was preparing for a comeback. On March 29, 2021, Kim released her second self-written and composed EP titled I'm with its lead single "Warning". Later that year, she featured in MC Mong's Flower 9 album with the song "Can I Go Back". On April 5, 2021, it was announced Kim would make her second musical appearance through Red Book, a feminist musical drama set in the Victorian era, as the main protagonist Anna. Kim performed from June 7 to August 24, 2021, for a total of 28 shows. Red Book Musical received a viewer rating of 9.9 out of 10, the highest among the top 20 2021 Musicals. The musical would later win the Best Picture Award, as well as Best New Musical Actress nomination for Kim at the 2022 Korean Musical Awards.

On May 4, 2021, Kim and the members of I.O.I celebrated their fifth debut anniversary with a reunion livestream show called "Yes, I Love It!". On July 23, 2021, Kim collaborated with Municon and released the digital single "Baby I Love U", a remake of the same song by Japanese singer TEE. At the end of 2021, Kim hosted the 2021 MBC Entertainment Awards with Jun Hyun-moo and Lee Sang-yi.

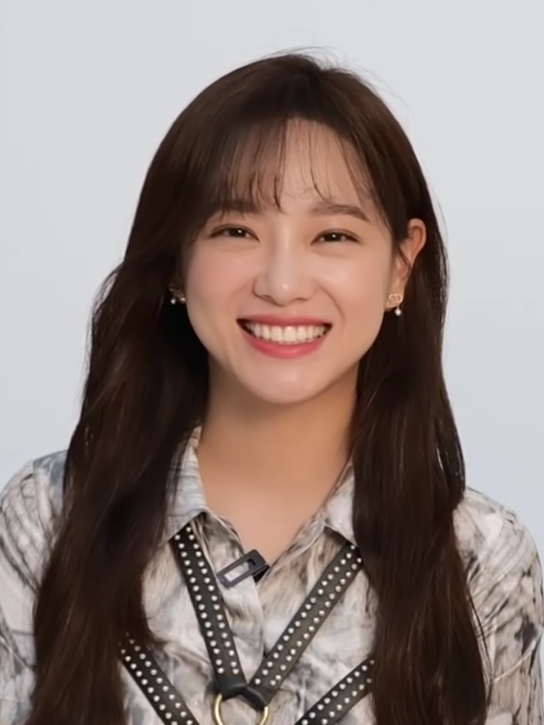
Kim for Marie Claire Korea in February 2022

In February 2022, Kim starred as the female lead for the SBS romantic comedy Business Proposal alongside Ahn Hyo-seop. The drama attained the highest viewership ratings (11.6%) for a terrestrial Mon-Tue drama in 2022 and was the fourth overall most watched drama on National TV. It is the first Korean-made TV series that was simultaneously shown on a local TV channel and Netflix to rank No. 1 on the official viewership chart and ranked eighth overall in Netflix's Most Popular Non-English Shows for 2022. Kim's performance drew praise from viewers and critics. An acoustic version of "Love, Maybe" sung by Kim was released as a bonus track. The track peaked at number 108 and 92 on the Gaon Digital Chart and K-pop Hot 100 respectively.

Kim also starred in another SBS television series Today's Webtoon alongside Choi Daniel and Nam Yoon-su that year. At the end of the year, Kim won the Popularity Award and the Best Actor Award at the 2023 Asia Artist Awards. Kim hosted the 2022 SBS Drama Awards with Business Proposal costar Ahn Hyo-seop and comedian Shin Dong-yup. For her performance in Business Proposal, Kim won the Top Excellence Award, the Actress in a Miniseries Romance/Comedy Drama Award, and Best Couple Award with Ahn.

In July 2023, Kim appeared in the second season of The Uncanny Counter, reprising her role as Do Ha-na. In August 2023, it was announced that Kim would embark on her first solo concert tour across 10 countries, kicking off in Seoul on September 23 and 24. That same month, Kim was announced as one of mentors of the reality competition series Universe Ticket (2023). Kim released her first studio album, Door (문; Mun), on September 4, 2023. In October 2023, it was announced that Kim would be debuting as a theater actress in the play Temple.

In November 2024, Kim appeared in the romance television series Brewing Love along with Lee Jong-won. In November 2025, she starred in MBC's historical fantasy television series Moon River opposite Kang Tae-oh. For her performance in Moon River, she won the Top Excellence Award for Actress in a Miniseries and the Best Couple Award (along with Kang) at the 2025 MBC Drama Awards.

On March 23, 2026, Kim left her agency of 10 years, Jellyfish Entertainment, and signed with BH Entertainment on March 24.

== Other ventures ==
=== Ambassadorship ===
Kim was selected as an ambassador for the 2022 Hanoi Hallyu Expo. In October 2023, Kim and Choi Young-jae were chosen as public relations ambassadors for Korea-Thailand Mutual Visit Year. Kim also participated in the Korea Health Promotion and Development Institute's campaign "Online Smoking Cessation", the Korea Creative Content Agency's campaign "Eradicate the use of Illegal Webtoon Distribution Sites" and the National Health Insurance Corporation's campaign "Smoking Cessation Treatment".

=== Endorsements ===
Kim was considered 2021's Top CF Star for her work as an advertising model in various fields, such as food, architecture, home appliances, games, and public service advertisements. She also took first place in 2017's Female Advertising Model Brand Reputation survey for June and July.

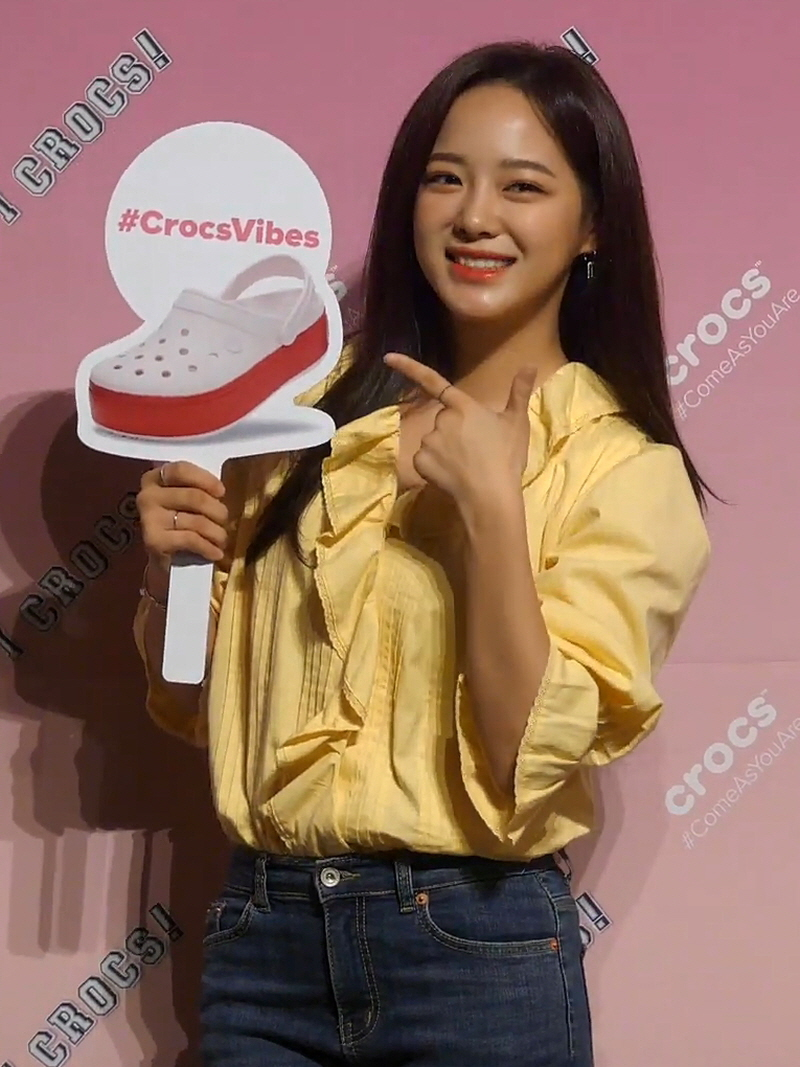
Kim at a Crocs event in 2019

She was the global advertising model for Crocs' "Come As You Are" campaign alongside actors Natalie Dormer, Zooey Deschanel, Gina Jin, and Japanese model Suzu Hirose. In 2018, she was selected as the brand model for Coca-Cola's spring/summer campaign with actor Park Bo-gum. She modeled for Lotte High-Mart and was paired with Cha Eun-woo for Lotte's popular Waterpark commercial film. In January 2019, she became the face of the alcoholic beverage, Good Day Soju, alongside celebrity chef Baek Jong-won. Kim was also featured in an advertisement for Dong Won Tuna together with actor Jo Jung-suk. In 2020, she and her The Uncanny Counter cast mates, Yeom Hye-ran and Moon Suk, modeled for Dyson Coral hair straightener product. Kim and Yeom participated in a three-episode web variety show titled The Uncanny Touch for the product's promotion.

In 2022, Kim was the endorser for cosmetic and clothing brands O!geti, Julie's Choice, and Roem; food and beverage products such as Goobne Chicken and Lotte's Starlight Cheongha Sparkling Alcohol; Living Workshop Household Goods and popular video game Nexon's MapleStory where she was chosen to sing the theme song for Cygnus Knights. In October 2022, Kim and Ahn Hyo-seop were chosen as brand ambassadors for Indonesian food and drink product Realfood. They collaborated with Indonesian actor Chicco Jerikho on a series of mini-commercial episodes to promote the brand. In 2023, Kim was the endorser for Namyang Dairy Products as the model for its flagship brand 'Delicious Milk GT'. In February 2023, Kim was chosen as the first Asian global ambassador for the French luxury brand Longchamp.

In January 2024, Kim was chosen as PlayStation's Asian model, as well as an advertising model for the clothing brand itMICHAA's second campaign "Do it all!".

Over the course of her career, Kim has also endorsed beauty products such as Manyo Factory Brand Cosmetics, Acwell, and Myskin Solus; food and beverage products such as Cocolab, Sunkist Fruit Cider, and Viyotte; online and RPG games Sudden Attack, Destiny Child: Defense War, and Armis. She appeared in other popular advertisements campaigns for various products such as Samsung's virtual assistant Bixby, Oella, and GH Basic Housing.

=== Philanthropy ===
On March 8, 2022, Kim donated ₩10 million to the Hope Bridge Disaster Relief Association to help the victims of the massive wildfire that started in Uljin, Gyeongbuk and has spread to Samcheok, Gangwon. On March 31, Kim donated ₩10 million to Fruit of Love, Community Chest of Korea to help war refugees in Ukraine. On August 19, Kim donated ₩20 million to the Hope Bridge Korea Disaster Relief Association to help those affected by the 2022 South Korean floods. On September 7, Kim donated ₩10 million to the Hope Bridge Korea Disaster Relief Association to support those who suffered damages due to Typhoon Hinnamnor.

On February 10, 2023, Kim donated ₩40 million to the Hope Bridge National Disaster Relief Association to help victims of the 2023 Turkey–Syria earthquake.

On December 22, 2023, the Korean Autism Love Association announced that Kim has donated ₩50 million for individuals with autism (autistic individuals) and their families. Through character research and acting practice for the play 'Temple', Kim developed an interest in and understanding of autism, expressing the narratives of characters with diverse histories convincingly. Her journey led her to donate to autism and families, delivering a message of hope and support.

== Image and influence ==
Kim was the vocalist for both I.O.I and Gugudan and is known for her sweet, powerful, raspy voice as well as for her emotionally healing songs. Kim cites IU, Girls' Generation's Taeyeon, and Ailee as her role models in singing and often uses their songs in her practice sessions. Kim is often called the icon of "Flower Way" through broadcasts and media after her famous speech to her mother, "I will only let you walk on the flower road from now on", during the first elimination round of Produce 101 where she won first place. Her first solo song "Flower Way" was based on the letter Kim wrote for her mother in Talents for Sale where she was a host. In August 2021, she won the Multi-tainer Award at 2021 Brand of the Year Awards for her works on various entertainment field such as music, drama, variety and musicals.

Aside from singing and acting, Kim is a sports enthusiast and known for her athletic skills and strong physique and has been featured on various entertainment shows and headlines thus receiving the tag "Strong Female Idol". Kim together with her group Gugudan are three-time gold medalists in three consecutive years and record holders for the Women's Archery Competition in Idol Star Athletics Championships and a gold medalist and record holder with her I.O.I and Gugudan member Mina in Women's Bowling Competition.

== Discography ==
=== Studio albums ===
List of studio albums, with selected chart positions and sales
Title	Details	Peak chart position	Sales
Title	Details	KOR	Sales
Door	Released: September 4, 2023; Label: Jellyfish Entertainment; Formats: CD, digital download, streaming; Track list: 1. "Voyage" (항해); 2. "If We Do"; 3. "Sea of Hope" (바라던 바다); 4. "Between Summer and Winter" (권태기의 노래); 5. "Destiny" (모르고 그려도 서로를 그리다); 6. "Top or Cliff"; 7. "Jenga"; 8. "Indigo Promise"; 9. "Send a Letter" (편지를 보내요); 10. "Over the Rainbow" (언젠가 무지개를 건너야 할 때); 11. "In the Rain" (빗소리가 들리면)	7	KOR: 27,491

=== Extended plays ===
List of extended plays, with selected chart positions and sales
Title	Details	Peak chart position	Sales
Title	Details	KOR	Sales
Plant	Released: March 17, 2020; Label: Jellyfish Entertainment; Formats: CD, digital download, streaming; Track list: 1. "Plant" (화분); 2. "Hopes for Tomorrow" (오늘은 괜잖아); 3. "Skyline"; 4. "Swim Away" (오리발); 5. "In My Dream" (꿈속에서 널)	4	KOR: 10,174
I'm	Released: March 29, 2021; Label: Jellyfish Entertainment; Formats: CD, digital download, streaming	19	KOR: 7,664

=== Singles ===
List of singles, showing year released, selected chart positions, sales figures, and name of the album
Title	Year	Peak chart position		Sales	Album
Title	Year	KOR Circle	KOR Hot	Sales	Album
"Flower Way" (꽃길) (Note: "Flower Way" was a promotional tool for Jellyfish Entertainment's digital music platform Jelly Box.)	2016	2	*	KOR: 976,110	Non-album singles
"Tunnel" (터널)	2019	121	90	—N/a	Non-album singles
"Plant" (화분)	2020	82	58	—N/a	Plant
"Whale"	2020	114	66	—N/a	Non-album single
"Warning" (featuring Lil Boi)	2021	98	—	—N/a	I'm
"Baby I Love U"	2021	179	—	—N/a	Non-album single
"Voyage" (항해)	2023	—	—	—N/a	Door
"Top or Cliff"	2023	—	—	—N/a	Door
"My Season" (Note: "My Season" is a remake of Shi Qi Shu Ne's song "Treading Mountain and River".)	2023	—	—	—N/a	Non-album singles
"Solar System" (태양계) (Note: "Solar System" is a remake of the original song by singer Sung Si-kyung.)	2025	—	—	—N/a	Non-album singles
"—" denotes releases that did not chart or were not released in that region. "*" denotes the chart did not exist at that time.

=== Other charted songs ===
List of other charted songs, showing year released, selected chart positions, sales figures, and name of the album
Title	Year	Peak chart position	Sales	Album
Title	Year	KOR	Sales	Album
As featured artist
"Can I Go Back" (돌아갈 순 없을까) (MC Mong featuring Sejeong)	2021	117	—N/a	Flower 9
Collaborations
"I Like You, I Don't" (좋아한다 안 한다) (with Lee Tae-il of Block B)	2017	8	KOR: 157,924	Non-album single
"Star Blossom" (별빛이 피면) (with Doyoung of NCT)	2017	— (Note: "Star Blossom" did not enter the Gaon Digital Chart, but peaked at number 74 on the Gaon Download Chart.)	KOR: 20,782	SM Station Season 2
"To Me" (내게로) (with Jang Hye-jin)	2021	— (Note: "To Me" did not enter the Gaon Digital Chart, but peaked at number 71 on the Gaon Download Chart.)	—N/a	Re:main
"—" denotes releases that did not chart or were not released in that region.

=== Soundtrack appearances ===
List of soundtrack appearances, showing year released, selected chart positions, sales figures, and name of the album
Title	Year	Peak chart positions		Sales	Album
Title	Year	KOR		Sales	Album
Title	Year	Gaon	Hot	Sales	Album
"If Only" (만에 하나)	2017	53	*	KOR: 68,848	The Legend of the Blue Sea OST
"Paramour" (정인 (情人))	2018	89	87	—N/a	Mr. Sunshine OST
"All of My Days" (나의 모든 날)	2020	50	31	—N/a	Crash Landing on You OST
"What My Heart Says" (내 마음이 그렇대)	2020	— (Note: "What My Heart Says" did not enter the Gaon Digital Chart, but peaked at number 137 on the Gaon Download Chart.)	—	—N/a	Record of Youth OST
"Meet Again" (재회 (再會))	2020	147	—	—N/a	The Uncanny Counter OST
"Love, Maybe" (사랑인가 봐) (Acoustic version)	2022	108	92	—N/a	Business Proposal OST
"Once Again" (다시 그렇게)	2023	— (Note: "Once Again" did not enter the Circle Digital Chart, but peaked at number 45 on the Circle Download Chart.)	—	—N/a	The Uncanny Counter 2 OST
"Two of Us" (두 사람)	2024	—	—	—N/a	Brewing Love OST
"—" denotes releases that did not chart or were not released in that region. "*" denotes the chart did not exist at that time.

=== Compilation appearances ===
Title	Year	Album
"Love is Like Rain Outside My Window" (사랑은 창 밖의 빗물 같아요)	2016	Immortal Songs: Singing the Legend (Composer Jeon Young-rok)
"Reflection of You in Your Smile" (미소속에 비친 그대)	2020	Immortal Songs: Singing the Legend (Shin Seung-hun)
"We Met Again" (또 만났네요)	2020	Immortal Songs: Singing the Legend (Part 2 of Joo Hyun-mi)

=== Composition credits ===
All song credits are adapted from the Korea Music Copyright Association's database under Kim Sejeong unless otherwise noted.

List of songs, showing year released, artist name, and name of the album
Title	Year	Artist	Album	Lyrics	Music
"Dear" (너에게)	2018	Gugudan	Act. 5 New Action	Yes	No
"Hopes for Tomorrow" (오늘은 괜찮아)	2020	Kim Se-jeong	Plant	Yes	Yes
"Skyline"	2020	Kim Se-jeong	Plant	Yes	Yes
"Swim Away" (오리발)	2020	Kim Se-jeong	Plant	Yes	Yes
"In My Dream" (꿈속에서 널)	2020	Kim Se-jeong	Plant	Yes	Yes
"Whale"	2020	Kim Se-jeong	Non-album single	Yes	Yes
"Meet Again" (재회 (再會))	2020	Kim Se-jeong	The Uncanny Counter OST Part 2	Yes	Yes
"Teddy Bear"	2021	Kim Se-jeong	I'm	Yes	Yes
"Warning" (feat. Lil Boi)	2021	Kim Se-jeong	I'm	Yes	Yes
"Do dum chit" (밤산책)	2021	Kim Se-jeong	I'm	Yes	Yes
"Let's Go Home" (집에 가자)	2021	Kim Se-jeong	I'm	Yes	Yes
"Maybe I Am" (아마 난 그대를)	2021	Kim Se-jeong	I'm	Yes	Yes
"Voyage" (항해)	2023	Kim Se-jeong	Door	Yes	Yes
"If We Do"	2023	Kim Se-jeong	Door	Yes	Yes
"Sea of Hope" (바라던 바다)	2023	Kim Se-jeong	Door	Yes	Yes
"Between Summer And Winter" (권태기의 노래)	2023	Kim Se-jeong	Door	Yes	Yes
"Destiny" (모르고 그려도 서로를 그리다)	2023	Kim Se-jeong	Door	Yes	Yes
"Top or Cliff"	2023	Kim Se-jeong	Door	Yes	No
"Jenga"	2023	Kim Se-jeong	Door	Yes	Yes
"Indigo Promise"	2023	Kim Se-jeong	Door	Yes	Yes
"Send A Letter" (편지를 보내요)	2023	Kim Se-jeong	Door	Yes	Yes
"Over The Rainbow" (언젠가 무지개를 건너야 할 때)	2023	Kim Se-jeong	Door	Yes	No
"In the Rain" (빗소리가 들리면)	2023	Kim Se-jeong	Door	Yes	Yes

== Videography ==
=== Music videos ===
Title	Year	Director(s)	Ref.
"Flower Way" (꽃길)	2016	Dari	
"Plant" (화분)	2020	Hwang Soo-Ah	
"Warning" (feat. Lil Boi)	2021	96wave	
"Baby I Love U"	2021	Unknown	
"Voyage" (항해)	2023	Ro Rockhoon (Studio Sapiens)	
"Top or Cliff"	2023	Hobin	
"Solar System" (태양계)	2025	Unknown	

== Filmography ==
=== Television series ===
Year	Title	Role	Notes	Ref.
2016	The Sound of Your Heart	Neighbor in Apt. 205	Special appearance	
2017	School 2017	Ra Eun-ho		
2019	I Wanna Hear Your Song	Hong Yi-young		
2020–2023	The Uncanny Counter	Do Ha-na	Season 1–2	
2022	Business Proposal	Shin Ha-ri		
2022	Today's Webtoon	On Ma-eum		
2024	Brewing Love	Chae Yong-ju		
2025	Moon River	Park Dal-i		

=== Television shows ===
Year	Title	Role	Notes	Ref.
2012–13	K-pop Star 2	Contestant	Eliminated in casting audition round	
2016	Produce 101	Contestant	Survival show that determined I.O.I members Finished 2nd	
2016	Talents for Sale	Co-host		
2017	Get It Beauty	Co-host		
2017	Law of the Jungle in Sumatra	Cast member	Episodes 256–261	
2017	Boat Horn Clenched Fists	Cast member	Episodes 11–15	
2018	Galileo: Awakened Universe	Cast member		
2018	Big Picture Family	Cast member	Episodes 2–5	
2023	Universe Ticket	Judge		

=== Web shows ===
Year	Title	Role	Notes	Ref.
2018–2021	Busted!	Cast member	Seasons 1–3	

=== Hosting ===
Year	Title	Notes	Ref.
2019	One K Concert (Note: Held at the National Assembly to commemorate the centennial of the March 1 Movement. The event was broadcast live on SBS Plus, SBS funE, and SBS MTV.)	with Cha Eun-woo and Lee Sang-min	
2021	MBC Entertainment Awards	with Jun Hyun-moo and Lee Sang-yi	
2022	SBS Drama Awards	with Shin Dong-yup and Ahn Hyo-seop	
2022	Seoul Festa (Note: Opening ceremony of the global tourism festival featuring the Seoul E-Prix, organized by the Seoul Metropolitan Government. The event was broadcast live on KBS World and KBS 2TV.)	with Cha Eun-woo	

== Stage ==
=== Musical ===
Year	Title		Role	Venue	Date	Ref.
Year	English	Korean	Role	Venue	Date	Ref.
2020	Return: The Promise of the Day	귀환	Lee Hae-sung	Woori Financial Art Hall in Olympic Park	June 4 to July 12	
2021	Red Book	레드북	Anna Knock	Hongik University Daehakro Art Center Grand Theater	June 4 to August 26	

=== Theater ===
Theater performances
Year	Title		Role	Theater	Date	Ref.
Year	English	Korean	Role	Theater	Date	Ref.
2023–2024	Temple	템플	Temple Grandin	Seokyeong University Performing Arts Center Scone Hall	December 15 to February 18, 2024	

== Concerts ==
Date	City	Title	Venue	Ref.
September 23–24, 2023	Seoul	2023 Kim Sejeong 1st Concert Tour 'The 門'	Blue Square Master Card Hall	
September 29, 2023	Hongkong	2023 Kim Sejeong 1st Concert Tour 'The 門'	Rotunda 3, KITEC	
October 1, 2023	Manila	2023 Kim Sejeong 1st Concert Tour 'The 門'	New Frontier Theater	
October 14–15, 2023	Taipei	2023 Kim Sejeong 1st Concert Tour 'The 門'	Zepp New Taipei	
October 21, 2023	Tokyo	2023 Kim Sejeong 1st Concert Tour 'The 門'	Zepp Haneda	
October 27, 2023	Singapore	2023 Kim Sejeong 1st Concert Tour 'The 門'	The Theater at Mediacorp	
October 29, 2023	Kuala Lumpur	2023 Kim Sejeong 1st Concert Tour 'The 門'	Megastar Arena	
November 4, 2023	Bangkok	2023 Kim Sejeong 1st Concert Tour 'The 門'	Thunder Dome	
November 17, 2023	Melbourne	2023 Kim Sejeong 1st Concert Tour 'The 門'	Festival Hall	
November 19, 2023	Sydney	2023 Kim Sejeong 1st Concert Tour 'The 門'	The Star Event Centre	
January 11-12, 2026	Seoul	2026 KIM SEJEONG FAN CONCERT "Tenth Letter"	YES24 Live Hall	
January 23, 2026	Taipei	2026 KIM SEJEONG FAN CONCERT "Tenth Letter"	Taipei International Convention Center	
February 13, 2026	Melbourne	2026 KIM SEJEONG FAN CONCERT "Tenth Letter"	Palais Theatre	
February 15, 2026	Sydney	2026 KIM SEJEONG FAN CONCERT "Tenth Letter"	Sydney Event Centre	
February 21, 2026	Manila	2026 KIM SEJEONG FAN CONCERT "Tenth Letter"	New Frontier Theatre	
February 28, 2026	Hongkong	2026 KIM SEJEONG FAN CONCERT "Tenth Letter"	AXA Dreamland	

== Accolades ==
=== Awards and nominations ===
Name of the award ceremony, year presented, category, nominee of the award, and the result of the nomination
Award ceremony	Year	Category	Nominee(s)/work(s)	Result	Ref.
APAN Star Awards	2022	Excellence Award, Actress in a Miniseries	Business Proposal	Nominated	
APAN Star Awards	2022	Popularity Star Award, Actress	Business Proposal	Nominated	
APAN Star Awards	2022	Best Couple	Kim Se-jeong (with Ahn Hyo-seop); Business Proposal	Nominated	
APAN Star Awards	2023	Excellence Award, Actress in a Serial Drama	The Uncanny Counter 2	Nominated	
Asia Artist Awards	2017	Popularity Award	Kim Se-jeong	Nominated	
Asia Artist Awards	2022	DCM Popularity Award – Actress	Kim Se-jeong	Won	
Asia Artist Awards	2022	Best Actor Award	Kim Se-jeong	Won	
Asia Artist Awards	2023	Popularity Award – Actress	Kim Se-jeong	Won	
Asia Artist Awards	2023	Best Actor Award	Kim Se-jeong	Won	
Asia Artist Awards	2023	Popularity Award – Singer (Female)	Kim Se-jeong	Nominated	
Baeksang Arts Awards	2018	Best New Actress – Television	School 2017	Nominated	
Brand Consumer Loyalty Awards	2020	Best Female Variety Idol	Kim Se-jeong	Nominated	
Brand Consumer Loyalty Awards	2021	Best Female Idol Actress	Kim Se-jeong	Won	
Brand Consumer Loyalty Awards	2021	Best Female Idol Entertainer	Kim Se-jeong	Nominated	
Brand Consumer Loyalty Awards	2022	Best Female Idol Actress	Kim Se-jeong	Won	
Brand of the Year Awards	2018	Female Idol-Actor Award	Kim Se-jeong	Won	
Brand of the Year Awards	2021	Female Multi-tainer of the Year	Kim Se-jeong	Won	
Brand of the Year Awards	2022	Best Female Acting Idol	Kim Se-jeong	Won	
Hanteo Music Awards	2023	Special Award (Ballad)	Kim Se-jeong	Nominated	
KBS Drama Awards	2017	Best New Actress	School 2017	Won	
KBS Drama Awards	2017	Netizen Award	School 2017	Nominated	
KBS Drama Awards	2017	Best Couple Award	Kim Se-jeong (with Kim Jung-hyun); School 2017	Nominated	
KBS Drama Awards	2019	Excellence Award, Actress in a Miniseries	I Wanna Hear Your Song	Nominated	
KBS Drama Awards	2019	K-Drama Hallyu Star Award	I Wanna Hear Your Song	Won	
KBS Drama Awards	2019	Best Couple Award	Kim Se-jeong (with Yeon Woo-jin); I Wanna Hear Your Song	Nominated	
KBS Entertainment Awards	2016	Rookie Variety	Talents for Sale	Nominated	
Korea Drama Awards	2017	Best New Actress	School 2017	Nominated	
Korea First Brand Awards	2019	Female Idol-Actor Award	Kim Se-jeong	Won	
Korean Music Awards	2023	Best Pop Album	"문(門)"	Nominated	
Korea Musical Awards	2022	Best New Actress	Red Book	Nominated	
MBC Drama Awards	2025	Top Excellence Award, Actress in a Miniseries	Moon River	Won	
MBC Drama Awards	2025	Best Couple Award	Kim Se-jeong (with Kang Tae-oh); Moon River	Won	
Melon Music Awards	2017	Top 10 Artist	Kim Se-jeong	Nominated	
Melon Music Awards	2017	Hot Trend Award	"Flower Way"	Nominated	
Melon Music Awards	2017	Hot Trend Award	"I Like You, I Don't" (with Lee Tae-il of Block B)	Nominated	
Mnet Asian Music Awards	2017	Best Vocal Performance (Female Solo)	"Flower Way"	Nominated	
Mnet Asian Music Awards	2017	Qoo10 Song of the Year	"Flower Way"	Longlisted	
SBS Drama Awards	2022	Best Couple	Kim Se-jeong (with Ahn Hyo-seop); Business Proposal	Won	
SBS Drama Awards	2022	Top Excellence Award, Actress in a Miniseries Romance/Comedy Drama	Business Proposal	Won	
SBS Entertainment Awards	2017	Best Challenge Award	Law of the Jungle	Won	
Seoul International Drama Awards	2022	Outstanding Performance of Korean Drama of the Year – Actress	Business Proposal	Nominated	
The Seoul Awards	2017	Best New Actress (Drama)	School 2017	Nominated	
The Seoul Awards	2017	Popular Actress Award (Drama)	School 2017	Won	

=== Listicles ===
Name of publisher, year listed, name of listicle, and placement
Publisher	Year	Listicle	Placement	Ref.
Cine21	2020	New Actress that will lead Korean Video Content Industry in 2021	5th (Note: Tied with Go Min-si, Kim Da-mi, Park Gyu-young, Park Hye-su, and Jeong Su-jeong)	
Forbes	2023	Korea Power Celebrity 40	26th	
