= I'm (EP) =

- Cover for digital and physical release

EP by Sejeong
- Released: March 29, 2021
- Recorded: 2021
- Genre: K-pop
- Length: 17:58
- Label: Jellyfish

Sejeong chronology
Plant (2020)	I'm (2021)

Singles from I'm
- 1. "Warning" Released: March 29, 2021

I'm is the second extended play by South Korean singer Sejeong. It was released by Jellyfish Entertainment on March 29, 2021, and consists of five tracks including the title track "Warning".

== Background and release ==
On March 9, 2021, Jellyfish Entertainment announced the Sejeong was preparing for a comeback. On March 17, the teaser video for her comeback was released. On March 19, Jelly Entertainment announced that EP I'm would be released on March 29, 2021. On March 21, the teaser audio for the title track "Warning" was released. A day later, the track listing was released.

== Track listing ==
No.	Title	Lyrics	Music	Arrangement	Length
1.	"Teddy Bear"	Sejeong	Sejeong; Lee Woo-min ("collapsedone")	Lee Woo-min ("collapsedone")	3:59
2.	"Warning (feat. lIlBOI)"	Sejeong; lIlBOI	Sejeong; Coke Paris; Kim Gi-san	Coke Paris	3:28
3.	"Do dum chit" (밤산책)	Sejeong	Sejeong; Coke Paris	Coke Paris	2:55
4.	"Let's Go Home" (집에 가자)	Sejeong	Sejeong; Lee Woo-min ("collapsedone")	Lee Woo-min ("collapsedone")	3:45
5.	"Maybe I Am" (아마 난 그대를)	Sejeong	Sejeong; MIN; BYMORE	BYMORE; MIN	3:47
Total length:					17:58

== Personnel ==
Credits are adapted from Melon.

- Background vocals – Sejeong
- Bass – Choi Jun-young / Lee Woo-min ("collapsedone")
- Guitar – Lee Woo-min ("collapsedone") / Kim Myung-hwan / Noh Hee-chang
- Piano – Kim Ki-san / Kim Jin-sol
- Synthesizer – Lee Woo-min ("collapsedone")
- Midi programming – Lee Woo-min ("collapsedone") / Noh Hee-chang
- Digital editing – Lee Woo-min ("collapsedone") at JYP Studios / Heo Eun-suk / Noh Hee-chang
- Recording – Shin Bong-won at GLAB Studios / Lee Woo-min ("collapsedone") at JYP Studios / Tak Hyeong-wan at Jelly Sound / Oh Seong-geun at Studio T
- Mixing – Shin Bong-won at GLAB Studios / Koo Jong-pil at Klang Studio / Uncle Cho (assisted by Jeon Bu-yeon) at JoeLab / Jo Jun-seong at W Sound
- Engineer for mix – Jeong Yu-ra

== Charts ==
=== Weekly charts ===
Weekly chart performance for I'm
Chart (2021)	Peak position
South Korean Albums (Gaon)	19

=== Monthly charts ===
Monthly chart performance for I'm
Chart (2021)	Peak position
South Korean Albums (Gaon)	83

== Sales ==
Sales for I'm
Region	Sales (2021)
South Korea	7,664

== Release history ==
Release history for I'm
Region	Date	Format	Label
Various	March 29, 2021	Digital download; streaming	Jellyfish Entertainment; Kakao Entertainment
South Korea	March 29, 2021	CD	Jellyfish Entertainment; Kakao Entertainment
