= Cummings' Guest House =

- U.S. National Register of Historic Places
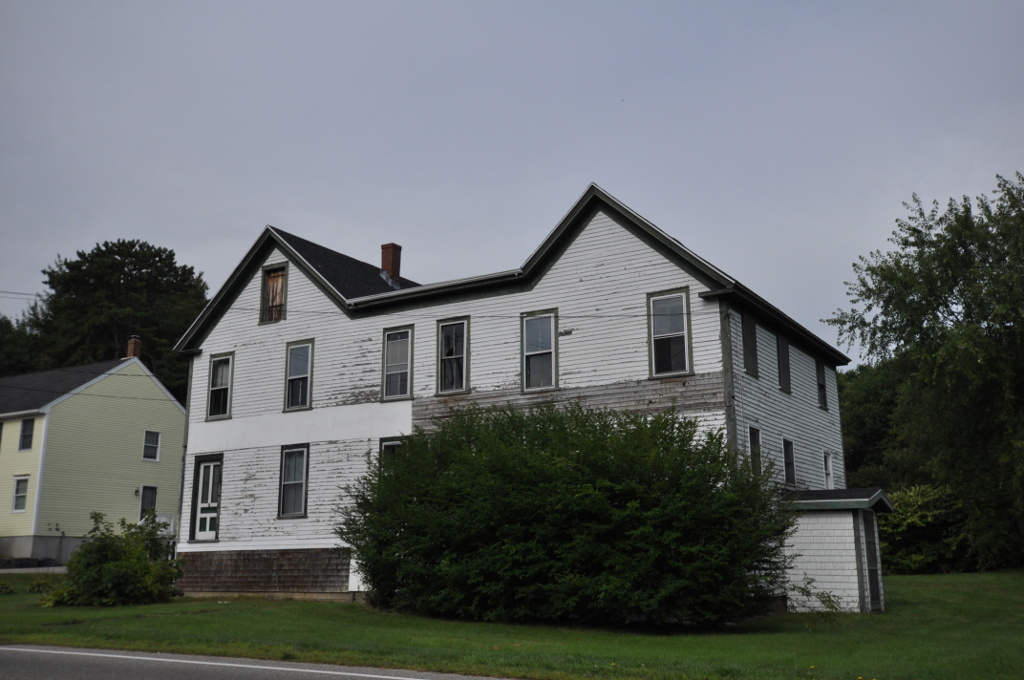

- Location within Maine Location within the United States
- Location: 110 Portland Ave., Old Orchard Beach, Maine
- Coordinates: 43°31′6″N 70°22′31″W
- Area: 0.5 acres (0.20 ha)
- Built: 1923
- Architectural style: Late Victorian
- NRHP reference No.: 04000744
- Added to NRHP: July 28, 2004

The Cummings' Guest House is a historic African-American summer boarding house at 110 Portland Avenue in Old Orchard Beach, Maine. Established in 1923, it was one of the only places in the community offering summer accommodations to African-Americans during the period of Jim Crow segregation. Prominent guests included Duke Ellington, Cab Calloway, Count Basie, and Lionel Hampton. The property, which reverted to completely private use by the Cummingses in 1993, was listed on the National Register of Historic Places in 2004.

== Description ==
The house is a vernacular Victorian wood frame structure built about 1870, probably as a farmhouse. The present structure includes the original house and a small barn, which have been joined by a two-story addition. The building once had a porch that wrapped around the southern and eastern facades, provide a measure of unity to the building's disparate elements; this has since been removed. The interior of the house shows regular adaptation to changing environment: its kitchen is from the 1970s, while its bathrooms retain fixtures and original plaster walls from the 1920s. The interior underwent some alteration in the 1960s, when the business began to decline due to antidiscrimination laws, and one of the Cummings children moved into part of the building on a year-round basis.

== History ==
Rosvell “Rose” Emerson Cummings and Edward Cummings Jr. purchased 110 Portland Street in 1917, and were Old Orchard Beach's first African-American residents. In 1923 they converted the house into a seasonal boarding house, catering to traveling African-Americans. The guest house was called The Homestead.

It was listed in The Negro Motorist Green Book. It was a popular accommodation, with word at first spread by word of mouth, and later by tour guides specifically targeting African-American vacationers. It regularly played host to African-American performers who played at the Old Orchard Beach Casino, but were refused accommodation at area hotels despite a lack of segregation laws in the state. In 1971, Maine passed a civil rights law governing public accommodations.

Performers who stayed there included Duke Ellington, Cab Calloway, Count Basie, Lionel Hampton, and Harry Carney, who became a regular visitor. Harlem Renaissance poet Countee Cullen stayed at the house and later dedicated a children's story to the cat of daughter Ann Cummings. W.E.B. Du Bois stayed at the house one summer. The boarding house was operated by the Cummings children until 1993.

The Jean Byers Sampson Center for Diversity in Maine at University of Southern Maine’s Glickman Library purchased the guest house register in 2008.

== See also ==
- Rock Rest, another Maine property that catered to African-Americans
- Portland Freedom Trail
- National Register of Historic Places listings in York County, Maine
- Black Travel Movement
