= Warning (Sejeong song) =

2021 single by Sejeong

Single by Sejeong

from the album I'm
- Language: Korean
- Released: March 29, 2021
- Recorded: 2021
- Genre: K-pop; rock; metal
- Length: 3:28
- Label: Jellyfish; Kakao
- Songwriters: Sejeong; lIlBOI
- Producers: Sejeong; Coke Paris; Kim Gi-san

Sejeong singles chronology
"Whale" (2020)	"Warning" (2021)	"Baby I Love U" (2021)

Music video
- "Warning (Jellyfish)" on YouTube "Warning (1theK)" on YouTube

"Warning" is a song recorded by South Korean singer Sejeong featuring South Korean rapper lIlBOI, released on March 29, 2021, by Jellyfish Entertainment and distributed by Kakao Entertainment. The single serves as the title track for her second EP, I'm.

== Background ==
On March 9, 2021, plans and preparation for a comeback was revealed. "Warning" will serve as the lead single for her second EP, I'm on March 29.

The teaser video for her comeback on March 17. The video shows an unexpected error code on the computer monitor's background screen with a warning saying "Warning". Unknown errors beginning with "Error 502" and the instruction "0x7e5311" referenced at "10101 00011 11101" were shown. A sound teaser was released on March 21. The music video teaser was released on March 27. The single was released on March 29, 2021.

== Composition and lyrics ==
"Warning" is a rock metal track written by Kim Se-jeong along with lIlBOI.

The track comes from her inspiration and thought that "it is okay to take breaks" where everyone feels the limit at some point. If one is unaware of it and keep on running endlessly, they will be overwhelmed, by the unbearable pain. The track aims to comfort listeners with her own colour while showing the importance of taking breaks when you need one. The lyrics also shows that breaks will allow you make your next step feel lighter.

== Commercial performance ==
The single peaked at number 98 on the Gaon Digital Chart.

== Music video ==
The music video was released on March 29, 2021. Sejeong appears in a starry and moonlit night sky and a house. The scene then turned to show the singer in a white costume as the moon rises and sets. In the video, Sejeong appeared in various forms such as holding a microphone and playing a joke, worrying, cleaning, or reading a book, creating a lovely and lively atmosphere.

== Promotion ==
Sejeong promoted the single and her album on music programs. She promoted the single with Verivery's Hoyoung it on M Countdown and other music programs.

The single was nominated for first place on April 6, 2021, at SBS MTV's The Show. However, it placed third, just behind Cosmic Girls and Pentagon. Sejeong placed third again, this time on M Countdown, behind Rosé's "On the Ground" and Kang Seung-yoon's "Iyah".

== Credits and personnel ==
Credits adapted from Melon.

- Sejeong – vocals, lyricist, composer
- lIlBOI – lyricist
- Coke Paris – composer, arranger
- Kim Gi-san – composer

== Charts ==
Chart (2021)	Peak position
South Korea (Gaon)	98

== Release history ==
Region	Date	Format	Label
Various	March 29, 2021	Digital download, streaming	Jellyfish Entertainment; Kakao Entertainment
