= Old Orchard Beach, Maine =

Town in Maine, United States

Old Orchard Beach
- Town
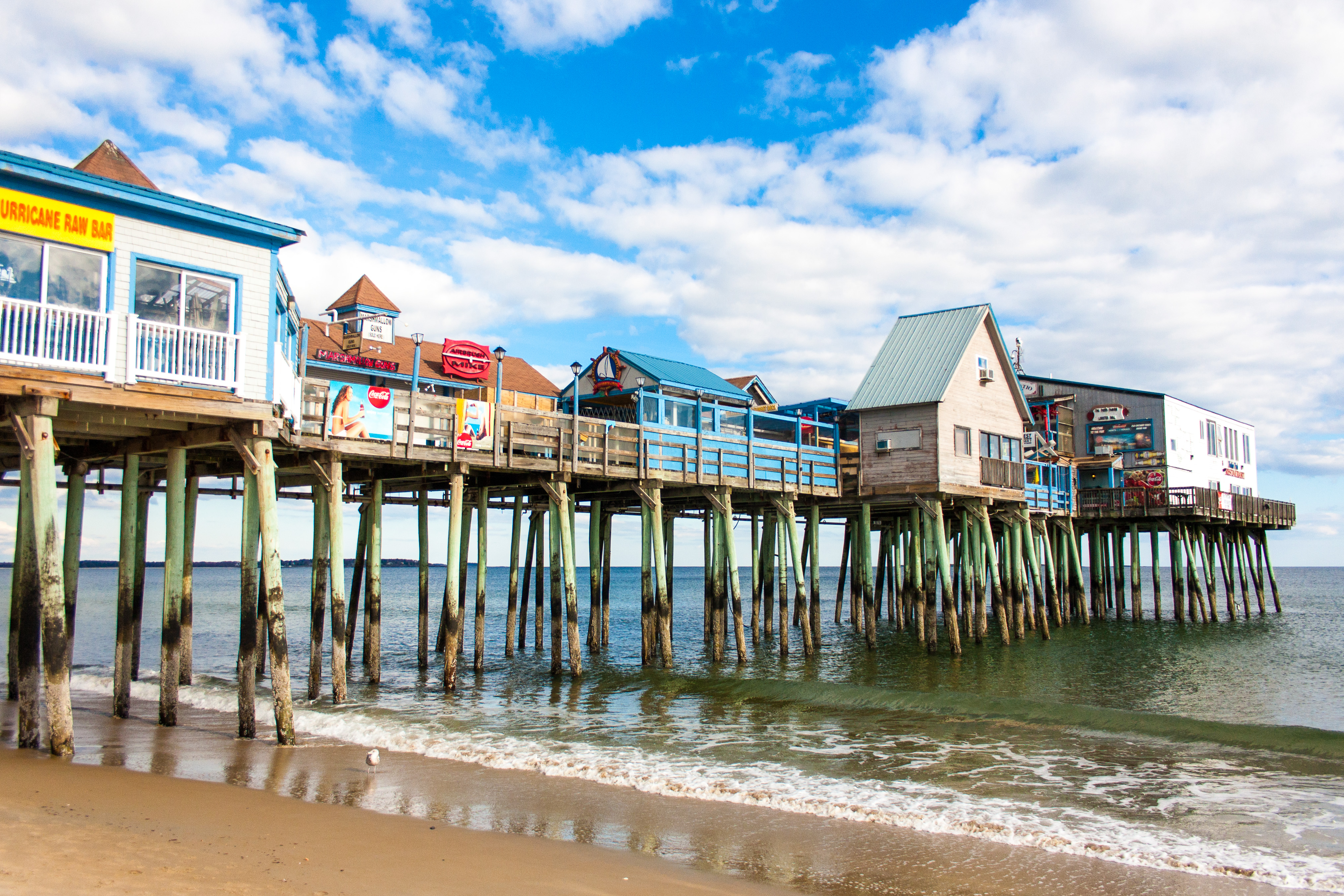
- Old Orchard Beach Pier
- Nickname: Garden by the Sea, after Thomas Rogers' town
- Location within Maine Location within the United States
- Coordinates: 43°31′3″N 70°22′39″W
- Country: United States
- State: Maine
- County: York
- Settled: 1653
- Incorporated: February 20, 1883

Area
  - Total: 22.53 sq mi (58.35 km^{2})
  - Land: 7.43 sq mi (19.24 km^{2})
  - Water: 15.10 sq mi (39.11 km^{2})
- Elevation: 0 ft (0 m)

Population (2020)
  - Total: 8,960
  - Density: 1,206/sq mi (465.7/km^{2})
- Time zone: UTC−5 (Eastern)
  - Summer (DST): UTC−4 (Eastern)
- ZIP Codes: 04064 (Old Orchard Beach); 04063 (Ocean Park)
- Area code: Area code 207
- FIPS code: 23-55085
- Website: www.oobmaine.com

Old Orchard Beach is a resort town in York County, Maine, United States. The population was 8,960 at the 2020 census. It is part of the Portland-South Portland-Biddeford metropolitan area.

Located on the inner side of Saco Bay on the Atlantic Ocean, the town is a popular seaside resort. The downtown contains many tourist-oriented businesses, including clam shacks and T-shirt shops. A wooden pier on the beach contains many other tourist businesses, including a variety of souvenir shops. The town's seven-mile (11 km) long beach extends into the towns of Scarborough and Saco, and is lined with many beach residential properties, condominiums, motels and bed and breakfasts.

== Early history ==
People of the Abenaki nation have inhabited the area since before contact. The first European visitor to the area around the mouth of the Saco and Goosefare rivers was British explorer Martin Pring in 1603.

The Old Orchard Beach area began appearing in historical records around 1653. The area was first officially settled in 1657 by Thomas Rogers who had arrived in the Goosefare Brook area in 1636, and who dubbed it "The Garden By The Sea". The town takes its name from Rogers' abandoned apple orchard. Rogers' family left the area and relocated in Kittery, Maine after an Indian attack destroyed the Rogers' homestead. The namesake orchard survived for approximately 150 years as a beacon of land to sailors in the Atlantic Ocean. The historic Free Will Baptist revival camp at Ocean Park, Maine, just down the beach from central Old Orchard, was built in 1881 by Bates College President Oren B. Cheney. The mission of the Association, as declared to the State of Maine on January 24, 1881, was "to establish a place of summer resort for holding religious, educational and other meetings at Old Orchard, in Saco, Maine, in the County of York.". The community still thrives today.

== Tourist resort ==
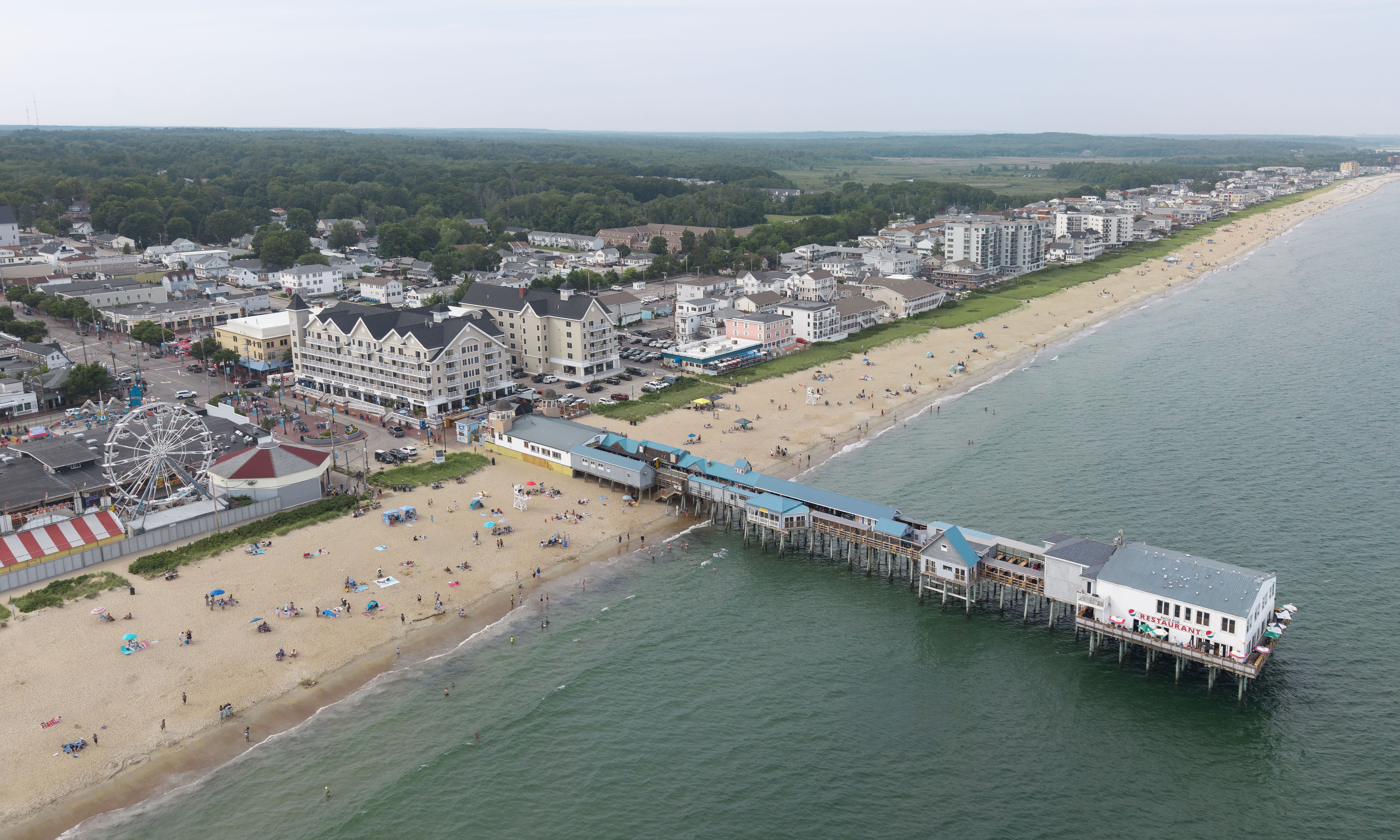
Aerial view of Old Orchard Beach

In 1829 the first Public House opened. In 1837 tourists were paying a small amount to stay at a local farm while they visited the area. In 1942, trains could be taken from Boston to Portland. Over the years Old Orchard developed into a major resort. At one point, planes were able to take off from the beach, as well as, some automobiles racing on the sand. Most of the large hotels were destroyed in the fire of 1907. The oldest hotel still standing on the beachfront in Old Orchard at this time is The Ocean House Hotel & Motel, circa 1895, located at 71 West Grand Avenue. It retains its original parlors and character. In 1923, when discrimination in lodging was rampant and Black musicians were denied rooms in other local hotels, the Cummings' Guest House opened at 110 Portland Avenue to offer lodging to Black visitors. It was operated by Rose and Edward Cummings Jr. and prominent guests included Duke Ellington, Cab Calloway, Count Basie, and Lionel Hampton. The guest house operated until 1993.

=== Attractions ===
The seaside amusement park Palace Playland is located in Old Orchard Beach. The amusement park dates back to 1902 and sits on four acres of beachfront property. Palace Playland is one of the last old-timey oceanside amusement parks in New England.

Old Orchard Beach was home to one of the first carousels in the United States, and in the past there were two carousels with hand-carved horses and other animals. Noah's Ark, a kid-friendly, boat-shaped funhouse with hand-carved figures of Noah and his family, was designed to provide an exciting but not frightening experience for a 5-year-old. The entire structure would rock back and forth while guests meandered through dark passages. Colored lights would flash, loud klaxons would sound, and compressed air would shoot from the floor. On the Jack and Jill slide, two people would be placed on a large hemp mat in a wooden bucket, which would take them to the top of a 50-foot (15 m) tall tower and dump them onto a metal slide for a quick ride down.

The current 2019 version of Palace Playland consists of a newly built Ferris wheel, a 24,000-square-foot (2,200 m^{2}) arcade, and 25 rides for both children and adults. The new Ferris wheel replaces the 70-foot (21 m) tall, decades old Sunwheel and a brand new roller coaster opening in 2018 known as the “sea viper”.

Every Thursday the beach has a firework show at the pier at night. This occurs in the summer from Memorial Day until Labor Day.

=== The Pier ===
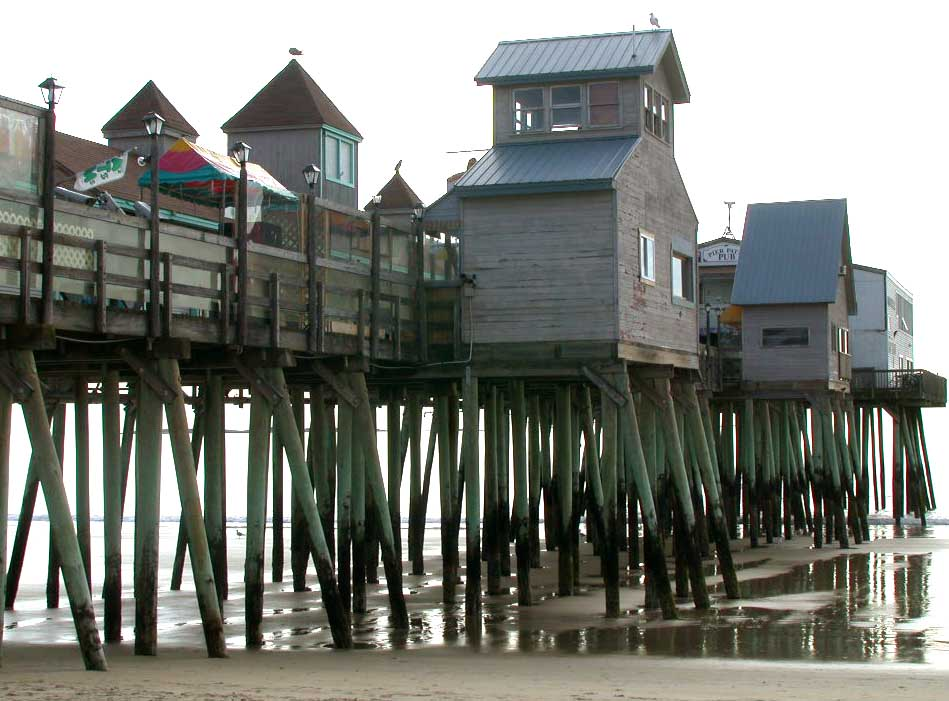
Pier at Old Orchard Beach

Three versions of the Pier were constructed by people and modified by nature. The first, 1,770 feet (540 m) long, was built of steel in 1898. When the ribbon was cut on July 2, 1898, it was a “global cultural icon,” at 1,825 feet the longest steel pier in the world, created by Berlin Iron Bridge Co. at a cost of $38,000. At its end was the Pier Casino, a ballroom with room for 5,000 dancers. Shortly after its completion a storm reduced its length by 150 feet (46 m). It was rebuilt, but 10 years later, after another storm, the pier was shortened to 700 feet (210 m) and the Casino was moved. In the interwar period, the Casino hosted such acts as Guy Lombardo, Louis Armstrong, Benny Goodman, Xavier Cugat and Frank Sinatra. After the war Old Orchard became somewhat downscale, becoming known as a destination for blue-collar partygoers. A fire in 1969 destroyed Noah's Ark, the two carousels, the Whale's Mouth, the Mine Ride, and the Jack and Jill slide. The Casino was demolished in 1970. The current incarnation of the pier was built in 1980 after being destroyed by a blizzard in 1978. The current structure stretches 500 feet (150 m) into the Atlantic Ocean. The wooden walk way is lined with souvenir shops, carnival-style foods, and a night club at the end of the pier.

== Sports ==
Old Orchard Beach was home to several minor league and collegiate level baseball teams. The Maine Guides played at The Ballpark from 1984 to 1988 and were the AAA affiliate of the Philadelphia Phillies. The Guides relocated in 1989 after finishing last in attendance and in wins in the International League during their final season in Old Orchard Beach. The Ballpark opened in 1984 and was renovated in 2009. Approximately $240,000 worth of volunteer labor and goods went into the project. Old Orchard Beach Surge, a baseball team which played in the independent Empire Professional Baseball League. The Surge relocated to Saranac Lake, New York in 2019 and continued to play as the Saranac Lake Surge. From 2012 to 2014, the Old Orchard Beach Raging Tide in the New England Collegiate Baseball League played at the ballpark. in 2014 Owners John and Pam Gallo sold the Raging Tide franchise, which became the Bristol Blues.

== Geography and transportation ==
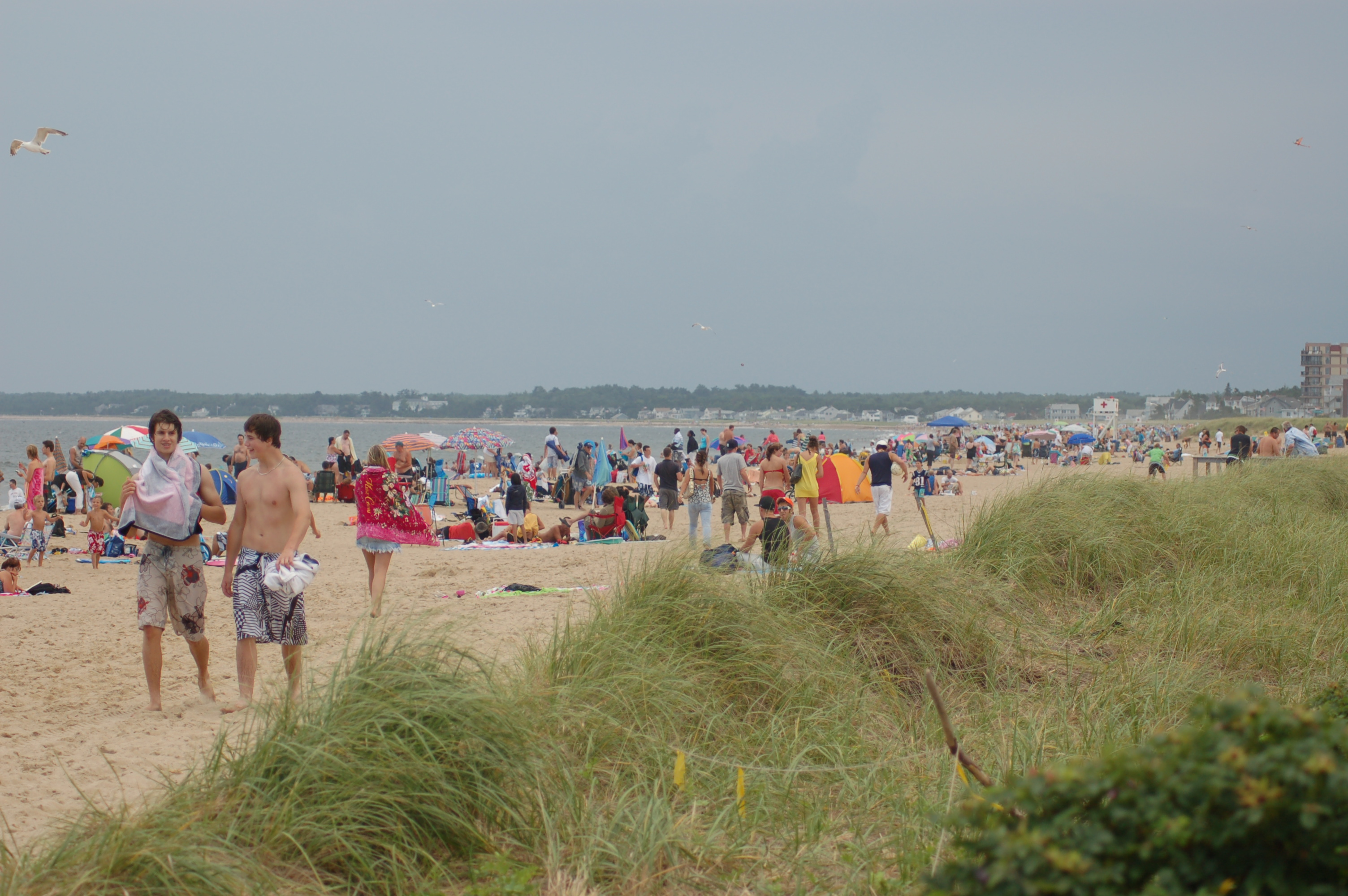
The beach at Old Orchard Beach

Old Orchard Beach is located on the Southern Maine Coast. It is bounded by Saco Bay to the east, Scarborough to the northeast, and Saco on all other sides.

According to the United States Census Bureau, the town has a total area of 22.53 square miles (58.35 km^{2}), of which 7.43 square miles (19.24 km^{2}) is land and 15.10 square miles (39.11 km^{2}) is water.

During summer months, Amtrak's Downeaster train stops at Old Orchard Beach station with service to the Portland Transportation Center and Boston's North Station.

== Twin cities ==
Old Orchard Beach is the twin city of the French seaside resort of Mimizan, as a reminder of Oiseau Canari, the pioneer aircraft crossing of the Atlantic by Assollant, Lefèvre and Lotti in 1929 to Oyambre (Cantabria, Spain).

== Immigration and foreign affairs ==
Old Orchard Beach, during the high tourist season, sees an influx of Lithuanian, Latvian, Turkish, Serbian, Bulgarian and Russian foreign exchange students looking for summer work. Many French Canadians, especially from the province of Quebec, come for summer vacations, and it is common to hear conversations in French.

== Demographics ==
Historical population
Census	Pop.	Note	%±
1890	887		—
1900	964		8.7%
1910	961		−0.3%
1920	1,164		21.1%
1930	1,620		39.2%
1940	2,557		57.8%
1950	4,707		84.1%
1960	4,580		−2.7%
1970	5,404		18.0%
1980	6,291		16.4%
1990	7,789		23.8%
2000	8,856		13.7%
2010	8,624		−2.6%
2020	8,960		3.9%

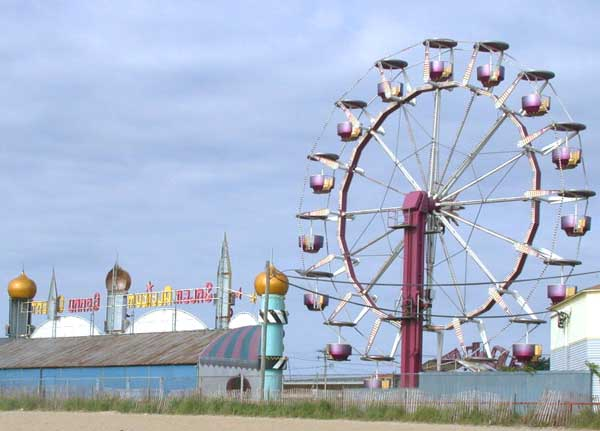
Ferris wheel seen from the beach in Old Orchard Beach

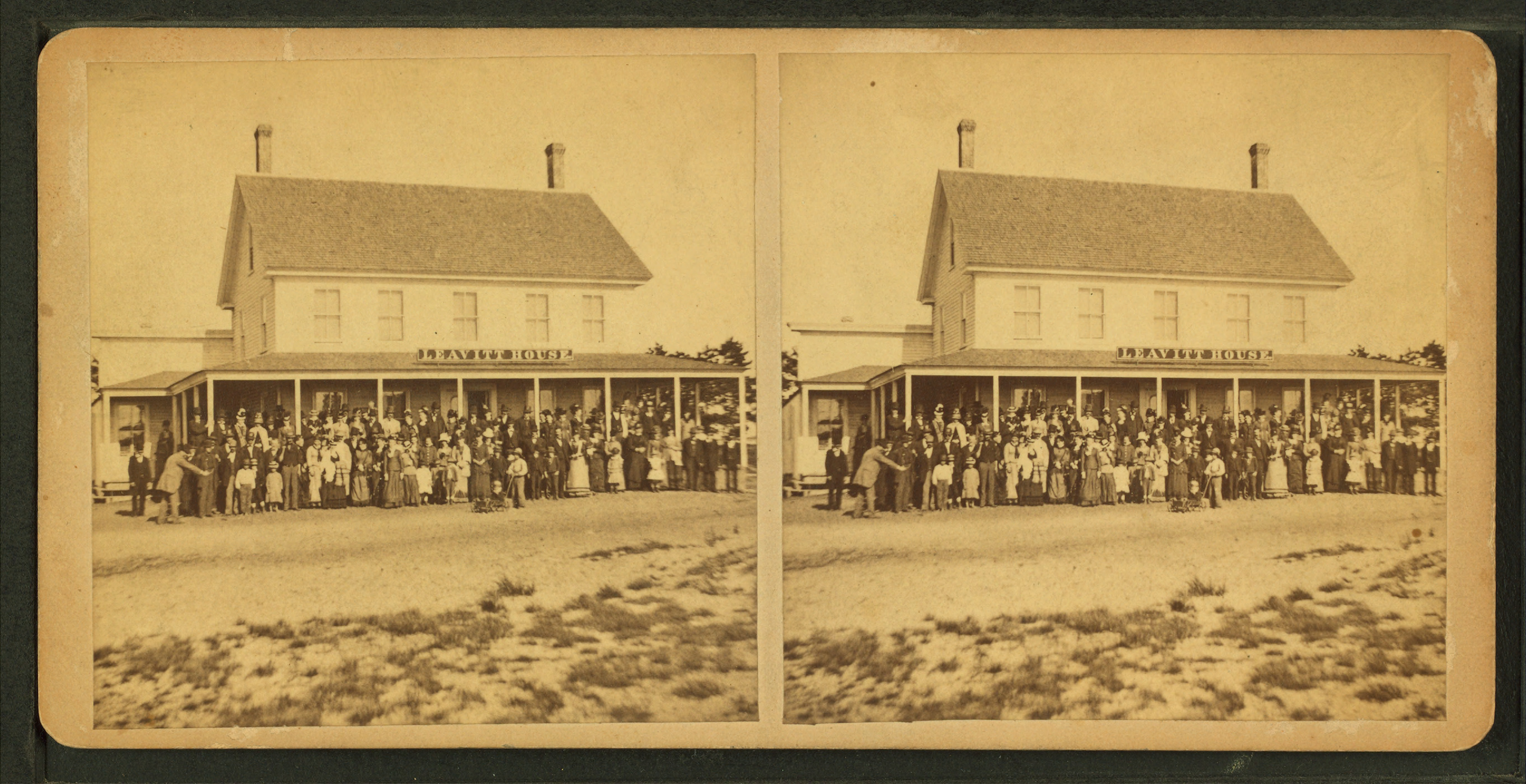
Leavitt House, Old Orchard Beach, Maine, c. 1870

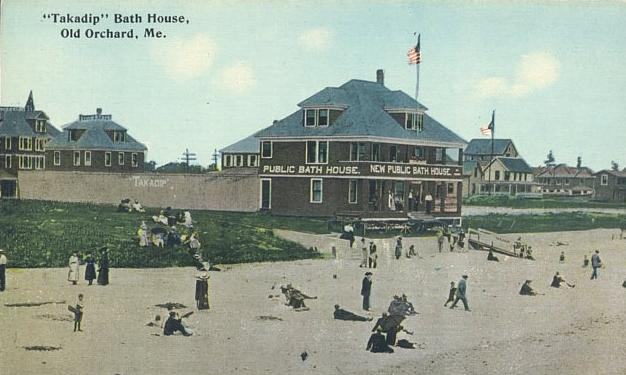
"Takadip" Bath House in 1914, Old Orchard Beach, ME

=== 2010 census ===
As of the census of 2010, there were 8,624 people, 4,454 households, and 2,106 families residing in the town. The population density was 1,160.7 inhabitants per square mile (448.1/km^{2}). There were 6,886 housing units at an average density of 926.8 per square mile (357.8/km^{2}). The racial makeup of the town was 98.2% White, 0.0% African American, 0.8% Native American, 0.9% Asian, 0.1% from other races, and 0.0% from two or more races. Hispanic or Latino of any race were 1.7% of the population.

There were 4,454 households, of which 17.2% had children under the age of 18 living with them, 34.6% were married couples living together, 8.9% had a female householder with no husband present, 3.8% had a male householder with no wife present, and 52.7% were non-families. 41.6% of all households were made up of individuals, and 13.4% had someone living alone who was 65 years of age or older. The average household size was 1.93 and the average family size was 2.61.

The median age in the town was 47.8 years. 14.3% of residents were under the age of 18; 6.9% were between the ages of 18 and 24; 24.1% were from 25 to 44; 35.7% were from 45 to 64; and 18.9% were 65 years of age or older. The gender makeup of the town was 47.9% male and 52.1% female.

Old Orchard Beach is in House District 13 and represented in Augusta by Lori Gramlich.

== Education ==
Old Orchard Beach is in the Regional School Unit 23. In 2025, there are 3 public schools serving a total of over 639 students in Old Orchard Beach: Jameson Elementary School, Loranger Memorial School, and Old Orchard Beach High School. The district's website is available here.

== Notable people ==
- Laura Creavalle, Guyanese-born Canadian/American professional bodybuilder
- David Lemoine, state legislator
- Leatrice Morin, state legislator (1973–1976)
- Jerome Plante, state legislator and town manager
- Charles Scontras, labor historian
- John McSweeney, state legislator

== See also ==
- The Ballpark
- Cummings' Guest House
