= John MacSween (disambiguation) =

John MacSween may refer to:

- Eóin Mac Suibhne (fl. 1310), Scottish nobleman
- John MacSween (haggis entrepreneur) (died 2006), Scottish butcher and entrepreneur

== See also ==
- John McSweeney (disambiguation)
