= John McSweeney (Maine politician) =

American politician

John M. McSweeney

Member of the Maine House of Representatives (District 117)
- In office 1979–1984
- Preceded by: John M. Kerry
- Succeeded by: Redistricting

Member of the Maine House of Representatives (District 17)
- In office 1985–1990
- Preceded by: Redistricting
- Succeeded by: George J. Kerr

Personal details
- Born: March 26, 1923
- Died: March 18, 1995 (aged 71)
- Party: Democrat

John M. McSweeney (March 26, 1923 - March 18, 1995) was an American politician from Maine. McSweeney, a Democrat from Old Orchard Beach, Maine, served in the Maine House of Representatives from 1979 to 1990.
