= Jerome Plante =

American politician (1935–2025)

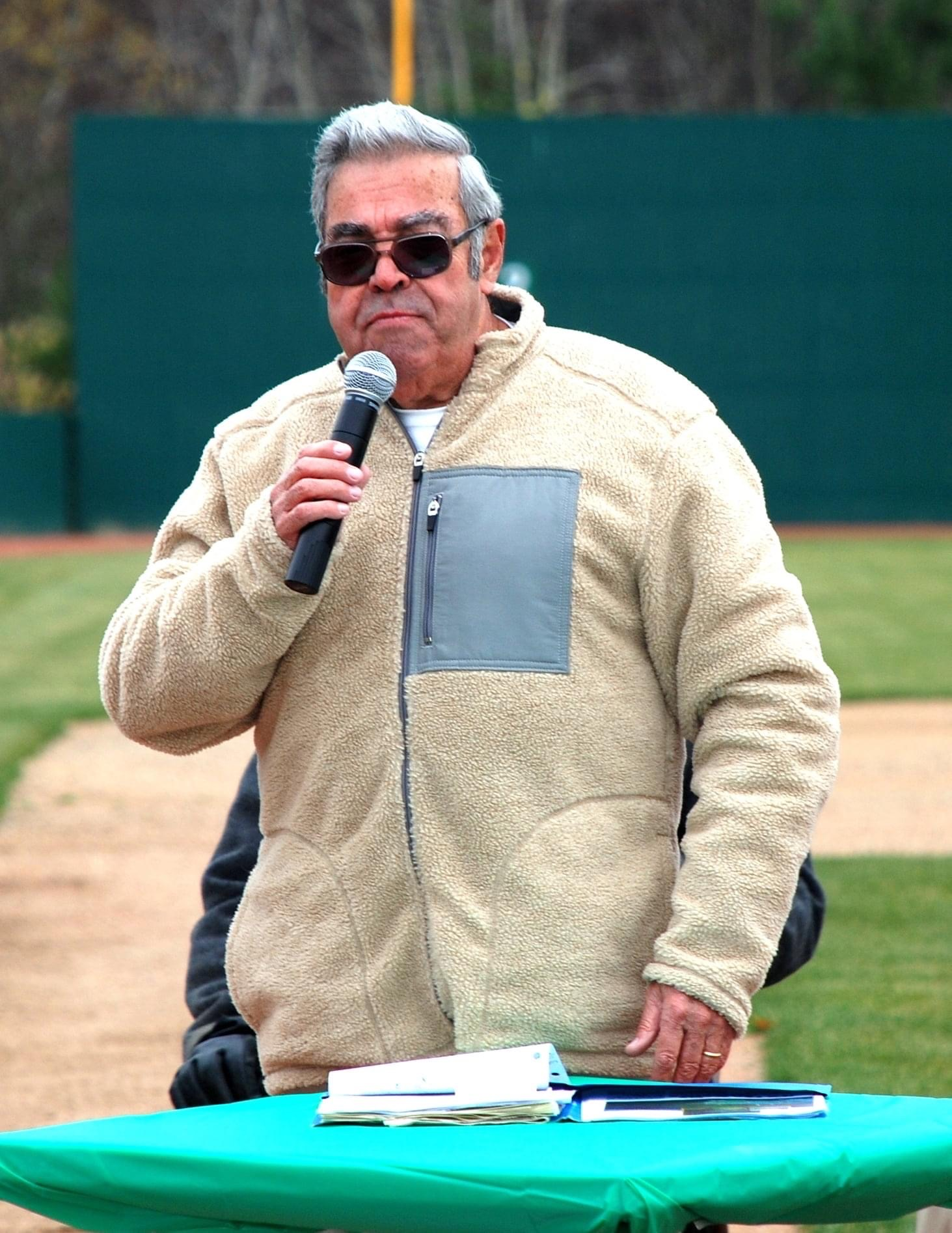
- Plante in 2021

Member of the Maine House of Representatives
- In office 1957–1965
- Succeeded by: Nicholas W. Danton

Personal details
- Born: Jerome G. Plante; January 8, 1935 Waterville, Maine, U.S.
- Died: February 8, 2025 (aged 90) Old Orchard Beach, Maine, U.S.
- Party: Democratic
- Children: 4

Jerome G. Plante (January 8, 1935 – February 8, 2025) was an American politician from the state of Maine. A Democrat from Old Orchard Beach, he served in the Maine House of Representatives from 1957 to 1965.

Plante served as Assistant Minority Leader during his second and third terms in the Maine House (1959–1963) and as Minority Leader during his fourth and final term (1963–1965). After leaving the legislature, Plante served on the staff of U.S. Congressman Peter Kyros from 1967 to 1975. He then served as town manager of Old Orchard Beach from 1975 to 1990. He also served on the RSU 23 School Committee and on The Ballpark Commission. In 2021, he was inducted into the Maine Franco-American Hall of Fame. He died in Old Orchard Beach on February 8, 2025, at the age of 90.
