= Richard Plant =

Richard Plant may refer to:

- Richard Plant (writer) (1910–1998), German-American academic, gay author and historian
- Richard Plant (racing driver) (born 1989), British racing driver

== See also ==
- Richard Plant Bower (1905–1996), Canadian diplomat
