= John Plant =

John Plant may refer to:

- John Plant (footballer) (1871–1950), England international footballer
- Jack Plant, actor in the 1967 film Ulysses
- John Plant (coach) (1877–1954), American sports coach at Bucknell University, 1926–1947
- John Plant (ethnologist) (born 1954), American ethnologist, biologist and expert on the culture of the Plains Indians
- John Plant, Australian creator of the Primitive Technology channel
