= Plant (song) =

2020 single by Sejeong

Single by Sejeong

from the album Plant
- Language: Korean
- Released: March 17, 2020
- Recorded: 2020
- Genre: K-pop; Sentimental ballad
- Length: 3:27
- Label: Jellyfish
- Songwriters: Sunwoo Jung-a; Ahn Shi-ae
- Producers: Sunwoo Jung-a; Ahn Shi-ae

Sejeong singles chronology
"Tunnel" (2019)	"Plant" (2020)	"Whale" (2020)

Music video
- "Plant (Jellyfish)" on YouTube "Plant (1theK)" on YouTube

"Plant" (Korean: 화분; RR: Hwabun) is a song recorded by South Korean singer Sejeong released on March 17, 2020, by Jellyfish Entertainment. It was initially distributed by Stone Music Entertainment but the music video has since been taken down and is now distributed by Kakao M. The track serves as the title track for her debut solo album of the same name, Plant.

== Background ==
On March 5, 2020, Sejeong released teaser photos regarding her comeback. Two music video teasers were unveiled before its release.

== Composition and lyrics ==
"Plant" is a sentimental ballad track which is composed by Sunwoo Jung-a and co-written with Ahn Shin-ae. The ballad expresses the feelings of consolation one receives from a small plant in a flowerpot. The lyrics describe the metaphor of caring for a plant, as caring for a loved one.

== Commercial performance ==
The single took top spot on the chart of music streaming site Bugs, second on Genie's chart and fourth on Soribada's chart a day after the release. It also peaked at number 82 on the Gaon Digital Chart.

== Music video ==
The music video begins in a dark but cozy room where she is seen relaxing, taking care of a plant seedling inside a plastic bag. She then exits her room into the outdoors, which is filled with garbage and pollution such as empty plastic bags. She eventually lands back into her room and smiles, seeing her plant she cared for be out of the bag, and sprouting a flower.

== Promotion ==
Sejeong promoted the single and her album on music programs. The single got its first win on March 24, 2020, at SBS MTV's The Show.

== Accolades ==
Music program awards
Program	Date	Ref.
The Show (SBS MTV)	March 24, 2020	

== Credits and personnel ==
Credits adapted from Melon.

- Sejeong – vocals
- Sunwoo Jung-a – lyricist, composer, arranger
- Ahn Shin-ae – lyricist
- Cho Song-tae – arranger

== Charts ==
Chart (2020)	Peak position
South Korea (Gaon)	82

== Release history ==
Region	Date	Format	Label
Various	March 17, 2020	Digital download, streaming	Jellyfish Entertainment; Kakao M; Stone Music Entertainment
