= William Plant =

William Plant may refer to:

- William Plant (racewalker) (1892–1969), American racewalker that competed in the 1920 Summer Olympics
- William J. Plant (1847–1905), Irish-American politician in New York
- William Plant (sailor) (1944–2018), Jamaican sailor that competed in the 1968 Olympics

== See also ==
- Bill Plante (William Madden Plante, 1938–2022), American journalist
