= Talents for Sale =

- Also known as: Welcome Show
- Genre: Home shopping Variety show
- Directed by: Oh Hyun-sook; Park Min-jeong; Shim Jae-hyun
- Starring: Kim Jong-kook; Lee Seo-jin; Noh Hong-chul; Kim Se-jeong
- Country of origin: South Korea
- Original language: Korean
- No. of episodes: 19

Production
- Executive producer: Seo Soo-min
- Running time: 80 minutes

Original release
- Network: KBS2
- Release: May 6 – October 7, 2016

Talents for Sale (Korean: 어서옵SHOW) is a South Korean variety show created and broadcast by KBS. It first aired on 6 May 2016. The show borrows ideas from home shopping channels, in which the MCs work together with guests to raise funds for local charities by advertising products created based on the guests' talents.

KBS announced on 12 April 2016 that it has signed a ₩1.62 billion one-year contract (US$1,376,481.6) with a Chinese company for the rights to air the Talents for Sale and another KBS show, Battle Trip, in China. This makes the Talents for Sale the first ever South Korean variety show exported to China prior to its first airing.

Talents for Sale aired at 21:35 (KST) every Fridays on KBS2.

== List of episodes ==
Notes	Winning team

# (Filming Date)	Episode # (Air date)	Guests	Teams	Identity	Product
1 (April 24, 2016)	1 (May 6, 2016)	Ahn Jung-hwan, Song So-hee, Oh Jon-ho, I.O.I (special cameo)	Ahn Jung-hwan & Lee Seo-jin	Former football player	Ahn Jung-hwan's Football Lesson
1 (April 24, 2016)	1 (May 6, 2016)	Ahn Jung-hwan, Song So-hee, Oh Jon-ho, I.O.I (special cameo)	Song So-hee & Kim Jong-kook	Korean gugak musician	Song So-hee's Gugak Event
1 (April 24, 2016)	2 (May 13, 2016)	Ahn Jung-hwan, Song So-hee, Oh Jon-ho, I.O.I (special cameo)	Oh Jon-ho & Noh Hong-chul	Professor at KAIST	A Futuristic Encounter with Robot HUBO
2 (May 11, 2016)	3 (May 20, 2016)	Ha Seok-jin, Seo Jang-hoon, Steve J & Yoni P	Seo Jang-hoon & Lee Seo-jin	Former basketball player	Seo Jang-hoon's Housekeeping Service
2 (May 11, 2016)	3 (May 20, 2016)	Ha Seok-jin, Seo Jang-hoon, Steve J & Yoni P	Ha Seok-jin & Kim Jong-kook	Actor	Ha Seok-jin's One-to-One Afterclass Tutorial
2 (May 11, 2016)	4 (May 27, 2016)	Ha Seok-jin, Seo Jang-hoon, Steve J & Yoni P	Steve J & Yoni P & Noh Hong-chul	Fashion designers	Steve J & Yoni P's Wardrobe Revamp Project
3 (May 25, 2016)	5 (June 3, 2016)	Cha Tae-hyun, Hong Kyung-min, Park Na-rae, Kim So-hee	Park Na-rae & Lee Seo-jin	Comedian	Park Na-rae's Comedy School
3 (May 25, 2016)	5 (June 3, 2016)	Cha Tae-hyun, Hong Kyung-min, Park Na-rae, Kim So-hee	Cha Tae-hyun, Hong Kyung-min & Kim Jong-kook	Actor and Singer	HongCha Duo's Event
3 (May 25, 2016)	6 (June 10, 2016)	Cha Tae-hyun, Hong Kyung-min, Park Na-rae, Kim So-hee	Kim So-hee & Noh Hong-chul	Chef at Kim Kocht, Vienna	Kim So-hee's Catering Service
4 (June 8, 2016)	7 (June 17, 2016)	Sistar, Moon Se-yoon, Zico	Sistar & Lee Seo-jin	K-pop group	Sistar's Summer Package
4 (June 8, 2016)	7 (June 17, 2016)	Sistar, Moon Se-yoon, Zico	Moon Se-yoon & Kim Jong-kook	Comedian	The Welcome Show Circus
4 (June 8, 2016)	8 (June 24, 2016)	Sistar, Moon Se-yoon, Zico	Zico & Noh Hong-chul	Rapper	Zico's Custom Songwriting Service
5 (June 22, 2016)	9 (July 1, 2016)	Park Soo-hong, Solji (EXID), Kim Jong-min, Julien Kang, Kim Shin-young	Park Soo-hong & Lee Seo-jin	Comedian	Park Soo-hong's Wedding Event
5 (June 22, 2016)	9 (July 1, 2016)	Park Soo-hong, Solji (EXID), Kim Jong-min, Julien Kang, Kim Shin-young	Solji, Kim Jong-min & Kim Jong-kook	Dancers	Kim Jong-min and Solji's Live Broadcast Dance Lesson
5 (June 22, 2016)	9 (July 1, 2016)	Park Soo-hong, Solji (EXID), Kim Jong-min, Julien Kang, Kim Shin-young	Julien Kang, Kim Shin-young & Noh Hong-chul	Actor and MC	Julien Kang and Kim Shin-young's Self Protection Class
5 (June 22, 2016)	10 (July 8, 2016)	Park Soo-hong, Solji (EXID), Kim Jong-min, Julien Kang, Kim Shin-young	Julien Kang, Kim Shin-young & Noh Hong-chul	Actor and MC	Julien Kang and Kim Shin-young's Self Protection Class
6 (July 6, 2016)	11 (July 15, 2016)	Kim Jun-hyun	Kim Jun-hyun & Lee Seo-jin	Comedian	Kim Jun-hyun's World Most Delicious Meal
6 (July 6, 2016)	12 (July 22, 2016)	Hwang Chi-yeul	Hwang Chi-yeul & Kim Jong-kook	Singer	Hwang Chi-yeul's Singing Class
7 (July 20, 2016)	13 (July 29, 2016)	Lee Young-pyo	Lee Young-pyo & Noh Hong-chul	Former football player	Lee Young-pyo's Youth Mentoring
7 (July 20, 2016)	14 (August 5, 2016)	Roy Kim, Kim Young-chul	Roy Kim & Kim Young-chul & Noh Hong-chul	Singer and Comedian	Roy Kim & Kim Young-chul's English Conversation
8 (August 17, 2016)	15 (August 26, 2016)	Yoo Hee-yeol	Yoo Hee-yeol & Noh Hong-chul	Singer-songwriter	Yoo Hee-yeol Family's Music For Only One Person
9 (August 24, 2016)	16 (September 2, 2016)	Ryu Seung-soo, Kim Ji-min, Heo Kyung-hwan, Hong Seok-cheon, Park Ji-yoon	Ryu Seung-soo & Lee Seo-jin	Actor	Ryu Seung-soo's Audiobook
9 (August 24, 2016)	16 (September 2, 2016)	Ryu Seung-soo, Kim Ji-min, Heo Kyung-hwan, Hong Seok-cheon, Park Ji-yoon	Kim Ji-min & Heo Kyung-hwan & Kim Jong-kook	Comedian	Kim Ji-min & Heo Kyung-hwan's Business Trip Make Over
9 (August 24, 2016)	17 (September 9, 2016)	Ryu Seung-soo, Kim Ji-min, Heo Kyung-hwan, Hong Seok-cheon, Park Ji-yoon	Hong Seok-cheon & Park Ji-yoon & Noh Hong-chul	Actor and Presenter	Hong Seok-cheon & Park Ji-yoon's Temptation of Food
10	18 (September 30, 2016)	Choi Min-soo, Jang Do-yeon, Solbi, Ji Sang-ryeol, Hwang Jae-keun	Jang Do-yeon & Solbi & Lee Seo-jin	Comedian and Singer	Jang Do-yeon & Solbi's Fashion Painting
10	18 (September 30, 2016)	Choi Min-soo, Jang Do-yeon, Solbi, Ji Sang-ryeol, Hwang Jae-keun	Choi Min-soo & Kim Jong-kook	Actor	Choi Min-soo's Leather Workshop
10	19 (October 7, 2016)	Choi Min-soo, Jang Do-yeon, Solbi, Ji Sang-ryeol, Hwang Jae-keun	Ji Sang-ryeol & Hwang Jae-keun & Noh Hong-chul	Actor and Designer	Ji Sang-ryeol & Hwang Jae-keun's Pet-sitter & Pet Fashion
