= Laplante (surname) =

Laplante or LaPlante or La Plante is a French surname. Notable people with the surname include:

- André Laplante (born 1949), Canadian pianist
- Charles Laplante dit Champagne (1838–1907), lawyer, judge and political figure in Quebec
- Courtney LaPlante (born 1989), vocalist of Canadian metal band Spiritbox
- Darryl Laplante (born 1977), Canadian professional ice hockey centre
- Deby LaPlante (born 1953), American hurdler
- Frédéric Laplante, Canadian politician from Quebec
- Joseph Normand Laplante (born 1965), federal judge for the United States District Court for the District of New Hampshire
- Laurent Laplante (1934–2017), Canadian journalist and essayist
- Laura La Plante (1904–1996), American film actress
- Lynda La Plante (born 1943), English author, screenwriter and former actress
- Mike LaPlante (born 1966), American college basketball coach
- Patrice Laplante (1929–2020), Canadian politician
- Violet La Plante (1908–1984), American film actress; sister of Laura La Plante

== See also ==
- Plante, surname
