= Running Man (TV program) =

South Korean variety show

- Running Man poster
- Hangul: 런닝맨
- RR: Reonning maen
- MR: Rŏnning maen
- Genre: Game show; Variety show; Comedy
- Created by: Nam Seung-yong; Ahn Jae-chul
- Directed by: Kim Sol-maro (2026–present); Kang Hyung-seon (2025–26); Choi Hyung-in (2022–25); Choi Bo-pil (2020–22); Jung Cheol-min (2016–20); Lee Hwan-jin (2016–19); Park Yong-woo (2016–17); Kim Joo-hyung (2010–14, 2016); Im Hyung-taek (2010–16); Jo Hyo-jin (2010–14)
- Starring: Yoo Jae-suk; Haha; Jee Seok-jin; Kim Jong-kook; Song Ji-hyo; Yang Se-chan; Ji Ye-eun; Rental member: Kang Hoon; Choi Daniel; Former: Lizzy; Song Joong-ki; Gary; Lee Kwang-soo; Jeon So-min
- Country of origin: South Korea
- Original language: Korean
- No. of episodes: 827 (list of episodes)

Production
- Camera setup: Multi-camera setup
- Running time: 80–95 minutes
- Production companies: SBS; SangSang Company; Urban Works Media

Original release
- Network: SBS
- Release: July 11, 2010 – present

Related
- Good Sunday; Keep Running; Running Man Vietnam; Outrun by Running Man; Running Man Philippines

Running Man (Korean: 런닝맨) is a South Korean variety show, formerly part of SBS' Good Sunday lineup. It first aired on July 11, 2010. It is the longest-running Korean variety show.

Running Man was originally classified as an "urban action variety"; a genre of variety shows in an urban environment. The MCs and guests were to complete missions at a landmark to win the race. The show has since shifted to a more familiar reality-variety show concept focused on games. It has garnered attention as being the comeback program for Yoo Jae-suk, the main MC of the program, after leaving Good Sunday's Family Outing in February 2010.

The show has become popular in other parts of Asia, and has gained online popularity among Hallyu fans, having been fansubbed into various languages, such as English, Persian, Spanish, Portuguese, French, Italian, Thai, Vietnamese, Chinese, Malay, Indonesian, Burmese, Arabic, Russian, and Turkish. The show has made it to the list of Business Insider's 20 TV Shows of 2016.

Since April 2017, Running Man is airing as the first part of Good Sunday at 4:50 pm KST and competing against KBS2's The Return of Superman and MBC's King of Mask Singer. Running Man previously aired at 6:25 pm KST on Sundays, as the second part of Good Sunday, competing against KBS2's 2 Days & 1 Night. The show celebrated its 11th anniversary on July 11, 2021, with 563 episodes, surpassing MBC's Infinite Challenge for the longest entertainment program in South Korea.

On December 20, 2024, it was revealed that Running Man will become one of SBS' Programs to be aired on Netflix as a part of partnership collaboration agreements.

== Format ==
=== Current ===
As of episode 48, the members have taken part in a series of missions to become the winner(s) at the end of the race. Missions form the basis of Running Man as members try to avoid punishment in earlier episodes or to win prizes. Multiple missions are presented in each episode, with the highlight of Running Man being race missions. The format of the show has veered away from the "race mission + others" to "one continuous race + missions".

=== Previous ===
Ep(s)	Airdate(s)	Notes
1	July 11, 2010	The MCs and guests were locked in a landmark during closed hours and were required to leave before opening hours. In the first episode, they were divided into two teams and raced to find the codes hidden within the landmark that were required to unlock the main doors. With a total of 5 numbers, after one was found, a game was played to determine which team would start first in the next race, and the losing team received a punishment while the other team was given a head start. After all the numbers had been found by either of the teams, they approached the main door and entered the code which they believed was correct. The exact team was allowed to leave the landmark while the losing team was required to complete a punishment inside the landmark.
2–5	July 18, 2010 – August 8, 2010	The second episode to the fifth episode, both teams competed to find golden pigs filled with money that was hidden within the landmark and participated in games in the attempt to win more money. At the end of each episode, the team with the most money was declared the winner and was allowed to leave the landmark while the losing team received a punishment. The money collected by the teams was donated in the winning team's honor. Viewers could vote on the official Running Man homepage on who they believed would be the winning team, and a lucky audience who guessed correctly was allowed to have his/her name included in the donation.
6–10	August 15, 2010 – September 12, 2010	Episodes 6 to 10, a consistent game format was used where both teams competed to obtain the most Running Man Balls (shortened to Running Balls in future episodes). Running Balls were awarded to the team that found a ball, and were also given to individuals who won a game, who received a Running Ball of their team's color (blue or red). Each of the games and races was referred to as missions, and were as follows: Mission 1 featured games related to the landmark. Previously, the Photo Zone Game was played at every landmark.; Mission 2 was the race mission.; Mission 3 was Leisure Time for a Cup of Tea. This mission was discontinued after episode ten due to controversies.; Mission 4 was Morning Team Sports. This mission aired in full only in episode six and only highlights were shown in episode seven due to time constraints.; At the end of each episode, the Running Man Balls collected throughout the night were placed into a lottery machine, and the color of the first ball ejected determined the winning team for the evening. The losing team was required to commute home using public transportation while undertaking an embarrassing punishment.
11–25	September 19, 2010 – January 9, 2011	As of the eleventh episode, the Running Man members and guests were no longer split into two main teams except for during the race mission, with smaller teams or individual game-play being used during the other missions. Everyone individually earned Running Balls throughout the missions and the balls selected during the lottery machine segment represented the individuals who were the winners for the night. The format of missions was also changed: Mission 1 was Challenge 1 vs. X.; Mission 2 was Find the Thief. From episode 15 this was changed to different games related to the landmark.; Mission 3 was the race mission, Bells Hide and Seek.; As of the eighteenth episode, only those who had earned no Running Balls at all throughout the night were the ones to be punished.
26–43	January 16, 2011 – May 15, 2011	Beginning with the twenty-sixth episode, the race mission, Bells Hide and Seek, was replaced with a Find the Guests mission. The MCs and guests were locked inside a landmark and were required to earn Running Balls for a chance to escape punishment. Through a series of missions, the Running Man members were divided into teams and/or individually earned Running Balls. The format for the missions in episodes 26 to 43 were: Mission 1 was the race mission, Find the Guests. From episodes 39 to 41, it was Catch the Running Man.; Mission 2 featured games related to the landmark.; Mission 3 was the One Chance challenge, which was played in episodes 27 to 31.; If there were many members with no Running Balls, they were automatically punished and no lottery was conducted. Additionally, if the members succeeded in the One Chance mission, they were all relieved of the punishment regardless of how many Running Balls each of them possessed. As of episode 38 and onwards, there were some episodes which included spy/spies. These spies could either be part of the cast, guest, or both.
44–47	May 22, 2011 – June 12, 2011	From episodes 44 to 47, staff (of the landmark location involved in the game) voted for who they believed would be the overall winner of the games and became supporters of that member/team. Teams were decided by the winner of the race mission, who received the first Running Ball, and the two teams then competed for more Running Balls throughout missions spread over two days (two episodes). The format for the missions was as follows: Mission 1 was the race mission, Find the Guests.; Mission 2 featured missions related to the staff of the landmark.; Mission 3 was a second race mission.; Mission 4 featured missions related to the landmark.; The team with the most Running Balls was declared the winner and their supporters received a bonus from their boss.
119, 131, 144	November 11, 2012; February 3, 2013; May 5, 2013	In these episodes, the members would arrive at the starting venue separately. An announcer would announce that "The XX Running Man is entering the arena". This announcement would include the guests for the day. After all the guest were introduced, the announcer would immediately announce their first mission. The race would officially begin after the first mission ends. The winner of the first mission would be given an advantage to his/her team in the race. The format for the missions are as follows: Mission 1 was the opening mission: Name Tag Elimination; Mission 2 onwards would follow the usual format of the show: one long race with continuous missions during the race.

== Personnel ==
=== Cast members ===
Current
- Yoo Jae-suk (Episode 1–present; 2010–present)
- Haha (Episode 1–present; 2010–present)
- Jee Seok-jin (Episode 1–present; 2010–present)
- Kim Jong-kook (Episode 1–present; 2010–present)
- Song Ji-hyo (Episode 7–present; 2010–present)
- Yang Se-chan (Episode 346–present; 2017–present)
- Ji Ye-eun (Episode 733–present; 2024–present)

Rental

- Kang Hoon (Episode 706–714; 2024)
- Choi Daniel (Episode 747–781; 2025)

Former

- Lizzy (Episode 18–25; 2010–2011)
- Song Joong-ki (Episode 1–41; 2010–2011)
- Gary (Episode 1–324; 2010–2016)
- Lee Kwang-soo (Episode 1–559; 2010–2021)
- Jeon So-min (Episode 346–679; 2017–2023)

==== Timeline ====
The original cast members consists of Yoo Jae-suk, Gary, Haha, Jee Seok-jin, Kim Jong-kook, Lee Kwang-soo and Song Joong-ki. Song Ji-hyo was originally a guest for the second (episodes 2–3) and third landmarks (episodes 4–5). She officially joined the program in the fourth landmark (episode 6), but was unable to attend until the fifth landmark (episode 7). In April 2011, Song Joong-ki recorded his last episode (episode 41) in May, leaving the program to focus on his acting career. He returned in episode 66 as a guest after almost half a year and later made cameo appearances in several episodes. After School's Lizzy was initially a guest for episodes 13 and 14, later joining in episode 18 as an official member. However, she left the show after episode 25 due to schedule conflicts with her group activities. She later returned as a guest in episode 292, 5 years since her last appearance. On October 25, 2016, Gary announced his departure from the show in November to focus on his music career after being with Running Man for 6 years, but later returned as a guest a week after his final recording (episode 325), and again in January 2017 (episode 336).

On April 3, 2017, it was confirmed through various media outlets that Running Man would add actress Jeon So-min and comedian Yang Se-chan to the cast. On April 27, 2021, Lee Kwang-soo announced his departure to focus on his treatment and recovery from a car accident, becoming the third original cast member to leave the show. On October 23, 2023, Jeon So-min decided to leave Running Man six years after joining the show to focus on her acting career, but later returned as a guest in episode 736, 14 months since her last appearance, and again in episode 774.

On May 14, 2024, SBS announced that actor Kang Hoon was added to the Running Man cast as the show's first rental member after his recent appearance as a guest on episode 701. On July 8, Kang Hoon recorded his last episode as a rental member (episode 715) before the Olympic season, with SBS announcing that they had discussed about his future appearance schedule after the Olympics. He later returned as a guest in episode 734, 5 months since his last appearance. On December 23, it was announced that Ji Ye-eun became an official Running Man member starting from episode 733 after her role as a rental member since episode 711. On March 24, 2025, it was announced that actor Choi Daniel joined the Running Man as the show's third rental member after his guest appearance in episode 742. On August 26, it was announced by CP Entertainment that Ji Ye-eun had temporarily paused her activities due to her health issues. On October 20, her agency announced that she had returned to the filming episode of Running Man that was aired on November 2. On December 14, 2025, Choi Daniel recorded his last episode as a rental member (episode 781).

=== Production staff ===
The staff run the games, often showing up on camera either by actively participating in the game or influencing the outcome of various missions. This includes the personal cameramen (VJs), production directors (PDs), floor directors (FDs), stylists, boom operators, etc.

At the show's inception, chief producer Nam Seung-yong was responsible for the production of the program, with PDs Jo Hyo-jin, Im Hyung-taek, and Kim Joo-hyung (also known as Myeok PD) mainly responsible for the directing and production of the recordings of the program. Other PDs have joined the program to assist as the program shifts from a single landmark to multiple locations for recording, notably Hwang Seon-man, Jeong Cheol-min, and Lee Hwan-jin. FD Go Dong-wan assisted in the recordings of the program and was known to be shown on camera many times, as well as delivering and assisting the members in missions. Producer Kim Joo-hyung has left the show as of episode 182, as he was reassigned to Inkigayo.

Each member has their own personal cameramen who follow them around exclusively during recordings. Notable cameramen include Ryu Kwon-ryeol (Yoo Jae-suk's primary VJ), Kim Yoo-seok (Jee Seok-jin's primary VJ), Choi Yoon-sang (former primary VJ for Lee Kwang-soo), Yoon Sung-yong (Haha's primary VJ), Sung Gyu (Song Ji-hyo's primary VJ), Jo Seong-Oh (Gary's primary VJ, now Yang Se-chan's primary VJ), Kim Ki-jin (Kim Jong-kook's primary VJ), and Ji Bong-jo (Jeon So-min's primary VJ).

On November 19, 2014, the show's head director, Jo Hyo-jin, announced his departure from the show after working with the members for four years. On March 20, 2016, the show's main PD, Im Hyung-taek left the show (as of episode 291), as he became the producer of Hurry Up, Brother, resulting in new generation PDs to take over, notably PD Lee Hwan-jin, PD Jeong Cheol-min, and PD Park Yong-woo. FD Go Dong-wan also announced his leave via his Instagram.

On July 3, 2016, SBS confirmed the return of producer Kim Joo-hyung to the show. That same month, it was confirmed that he would become the new main PD of the show. However, PD Kim Joo-hyung announced his departure from the show shortly after. Subsequently, PD Lee Hwan-jin took over as the main PD of Running Man until March 2017. In April 2017, PD Jeong Cheol-min took over from PD Lee Hwan-Jin as the show's main PD.

In July 2018, PD Jeong Cheol-min took a break and PD Lee Hwan-jin temporarily took over as main PD of the show. PD Jeong returned in May 2019 replacing PD Lee, leading the show till February 5, 2020, where he left the show and SBS. His role was taken over by PD Choi Bo-pil.

On August 1, 2022, SBS announced that PD Choi Bo-pil would be leaving the show. He was replaced by PD Choi Hyung-in, the first female production director in the show's history.

On December 14, 2025, SBS announced that PD Choi Hyung-in would be leaving the show due to her pregnancy and want to focus on her family, with PD Kang Hyung-seon taking over the role as the main PD.

On May 24, 2026, SBS announced that PD Kang Hyung-seon would be leaving the show after her 5 months tenure as Main PD due to her pregnancy, with PD Kim Sol-maro taking over the role as the main PD.

=== Guests with the most appearances ===
Aside from guests who became permanent cast members (Song Ji-hyo, Yang Se-chan and Ji Ye-eun), or former cast members who were once guests (Lizzy and Jeon So-min), or even guests who were temporary rental members (Kang Hoon and Choi Daniel), some guests were occasionally featured or invited to the show during its run. The following list is of guests who appeared the most often as of October 15, 2026.

Rank	Name	No. of episodes	Episodes	Occupation
1	Choi Daniel	36	736, 742, 747-761, 763-781	Actor
2	Ji Ye-eun	23	707, 709, 710-718, 721-732	Actress
3	Kang Han-na	22	343, 380, 392–396, 399–400, 406–408, 426–427, 476–477, 480, 486, 490–491, 509, 702	Actress
4	Heo Kyung-hwan	21	202–203, 339, 390–392, 477–478, 483–484, 490–491, 642, 708- 709, 743, 779- 780, 819, 821- 822	Comedian
5	Hong Jin-young	20	205, 221, 266, 299, 356–357, 392–396, 399–400, 406–408, 439, 442, 469, 499	Singer
5	Kang Hoon	20	649, 654–655, 669–670, 697, 701, 706-714, 734, 781, 813, 826	Actor
7	Jo Se-ho	17	305, 360–361, 367–368, 374–375, 499, 510, 550, 594, 606–607, 630, 654–655, 687	Comedian
8	Lee Sang-yeob	16	381, 390–396, 399–400, 406–408, 415, 453, 509	Actor
9	Yoon Bo-mi	15	202–203, 255, 344, 372, 458–459, 467–469, 500, 529–530, 611, 785	Member of Apink
10	Kim Dong-hyun	14	150, 239, 305, 317, 637, 656, 685, 686, 688, 693–694, 695, 701, 807	MMA Fighter

== Episodes ==
Year	Episodes	Originally released	
Year	Episodes	First released	Last released
2010	23	July 11, 2010	December 26, 2010
2011	51	January 2, 2011	December 25, 2011
2012	52	January 1, 2012	December 30, 2012
2013	52	January 6, 2013	December 29, 2013
2014	49	January 5, 2014	December 28, 2014
2015	52	January 4, 2015	December 27, 2015
2016	52	January 3, 2016	December 25, 2016
2017	52	January 1, 2017	December 31, 2017
2018	49	January 7, 2018	December 30, 2018
2019	51	January 6, 2019	December 29, 2019
2020	52	January 5, 2020	December 27, 2020
2021	50	January 3, 2021	December 26, 2021
2022	49	January 2, 2022	December 25, 2022
2023	52	January 1, 2023	December 31, 2023
2024	48	January 7, 2024	December 22, 2024
2025	50	January 5, 2025	December 28, 2025
2026	44	January 4, 2026	TBA

== Guests ==
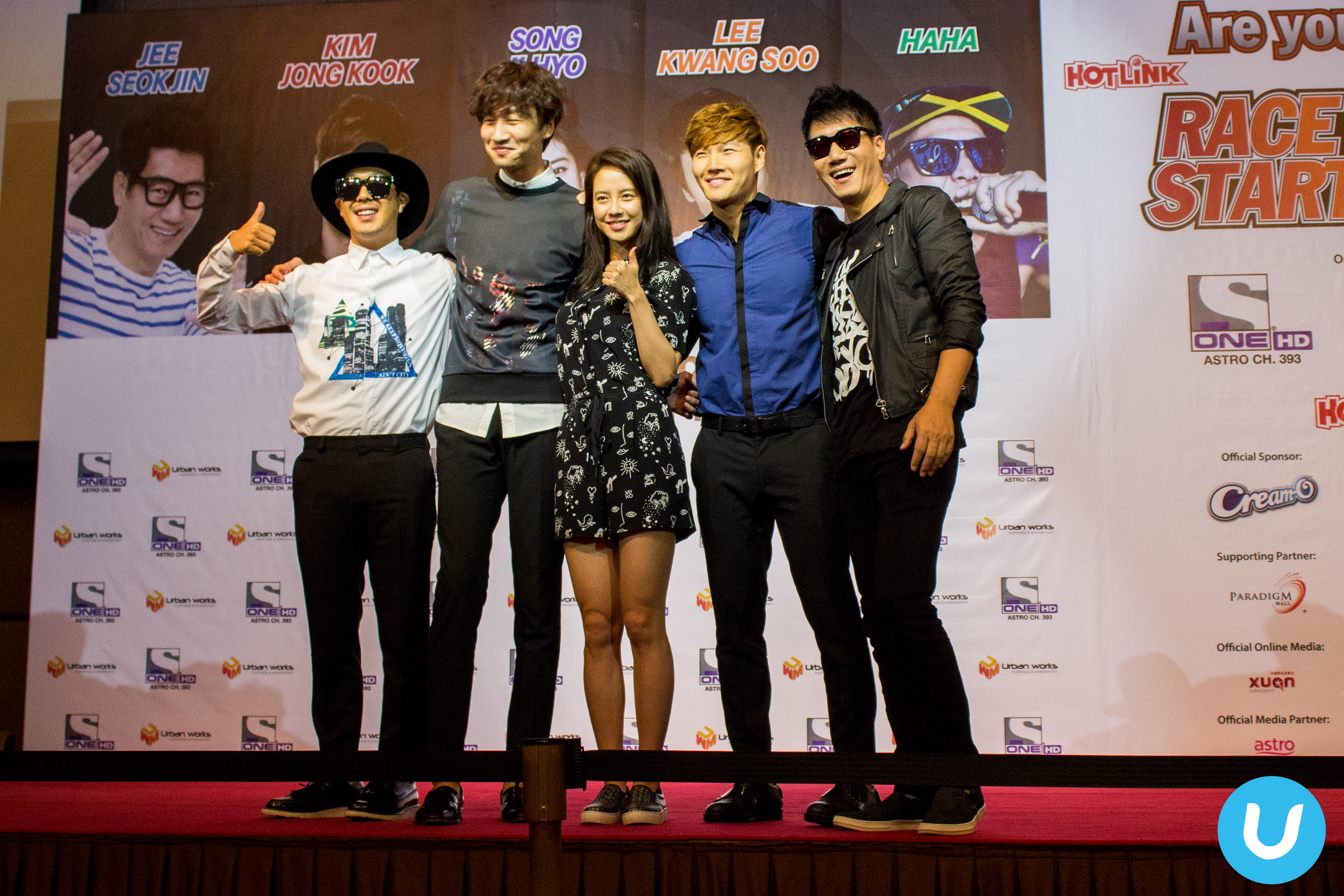
Five of Running Man's permanent cast (Haha, Lee Kwang-soo, Song Ji-Hyo, Kim Jong-kook, and Jee Seok-jin) in Malaysia at a fan meeting

Many guests have taken part in Running Man. The following is a compilation of guests and the number of times they have been on the show. With regards to guest-turned-members (Song Ji-Hyo, Jeon So-min, Yang Se-chan, Ji Ye-eun) or former members of the show (Lizzy, Song Joong-ki, Gary, Lee Kwang-soo, Jeon So-min, Kang Hoon), only the times they were a guest are counted. The guests were sorted according to their appearances and the number of episodes that appeared.

List of Running Man guests
Rank	Guest	Episode(s)	No. of episodes	No. of appearances
1	Choi Daniel	736, 742, 747-761, 763-781	36	2
2	Ji Ye-eun	707, 709, 710-718, 721-732	23	2
3	Kang Han-na	343, 380, 392–396, 399–400, 406–408, 426–427, 476–477, 480, 486, 490–491, 509, 702	22	14
4	Heo Kyung-hwan	202–203, 339, 390–392, 477–478, 483–484, 490–491, 642, 708-709, 743,779-780, 819,821-822	21	13
5	Hong Jin-young	205, 221, 266, 299, 356–357, 392–396, 399–400, 406–408, 439, 442, 469, 499	20	12
5	Kang Hoon	649, 654–655, 669–670, 697, 701, 706-714, 734, 781, 813,826	20	9
7	Cho Sae-ho	305, 360–361, 367–368, 374–375, 499, 510, 550, 594, 606–607, 630, 654–655, 687	17	12
8	Lee Sang-yeob	381, 390–396, 399–400, 406–408, 415, 453, 509	16	8
9	Yoon Bo-mi (Apink)	202–203, 255, 344, 372, 458–459, 467–469, 500, 529–530, 611, 785	15	10
10	Kim Dong-hyun	150, 239, 305, 317, 637, 656, 685, 686, 688, 693–694, 695, 701, 807	14	13
11	Son Na-eun (Apink)	162, 202–203, 356–357, 360–361, 424, 458–459, 467–469	13	7
12	Jung Yong-hwa (CNBLUE)	7, 11, 17, 35–36, 72–73, 104, 127, 129, 186, 242	12	10
12	Hong Jin-ho	257, 275, 292, 680–681, 688, 693–694, 695, 719, 789, 815	12	10
12	Lee Da-hee	388–389, 392–396, 399–400, 406–408	12	5
15	Nichkhun (2PM)	4–5, 19, 40, 50–51, 104, 195, 248, 256, 306	11	9
15	Oh Ha-young (Apink)	356–357, 458–459, 467–469, 697,708-709, 785	11	6
17	Park Cho-rong (Apink)	458–459, 467–469, 486, 500, 611, 785, 823	10	7
18	Seungri (BigBang)	30, 84–85, 163, 190, 250, 416–417, 436	9	7
18	Jung Eun-ji (Apink)	162, 218, 458–459, 467–469, 785, 816	9	7
18	Ha Do-kwon	515, 530–531, 542, 564, 584–585, 615–616	9	7
18	Joo Woo-jae	588–589, 592, 601, 615–616, 635–636, 645	9	7
18	Park Ji-sung	96–97, 152–154, 199–200, 283–284	9	4
23	Lee Joon (MBLAQ)	8, 95, 104, 108, 129, 162, 320, 675	8	8
23	Kyuhyun (Super Junior)	221, 265, 687, 730, 738, 760, 790, 827	8	8
25	Noh Sa-yeon	49, 103, 137, 313, 374–375, 415, 499	8	7
26	Bae Suzy (Miss A)	55, 93–94, 117, 155, 172–173, 208	8	6
27	Sunmi (Wonder Girls)	367–368, 416–417, 466–467, 510, 777	8	5
27	Kim Nam-joo (Apink)	458–459, 467–469, 529–530, 785	8	4
28	Kim Kwang-kyu	15, 32, 159, 176, 271–272, 274	7	6
28	Kim Woo-bin	138, 166, 188–189, 191, 225, 240	7	6
28	Kim Dong-jun (ZE:A)	192–194, 236, 513, 546, 721, 727	7	6
31	Lee Chun-hee	2–3, 76–77, 226, 269, 339	7	5
31	Cha Tae-hyun	10, 57–58, 532, 643–644, 770	7	5
33	Seol In-ah	388–389, 426–427, 457, 551–552	7	4
34	Park Seo-joon	184, 198, 246, 263, 295, 362	6	6
34	Soyou (Sistar)	209, 255, 307, 366, 383, 513	6	6
34	Da-hyun (Twice)	302, 328, 398, 428, 506, 730	6	6
34	Miyeon (I-dle)	677, 753, 761, 777, 810, 819	6	6
34	Kwon Eun-bi	684, 703, 720, 771, 786, 818	6	6
34	Kim Ah-young	717, 725, 742, 750, 756, 767	6	6
39	Lim Yoona (Girls' Generation)	39, 63–64, 254, 363, 460	6	5
39	Eunhyuk (Super Junior)	104, 266, 376, 589–590, 760	6	5
39	Park Soo-hong	179–180, 207, 220, 274, 321	6	5
39	Kim Seol-hyun (AOA)	210, 255, 278–279, 402, 481	6	5
39	Lee Mi-joo (Lovelyz)	313, 500, 513, 532, 571–572	6	5
44	Goo Hara (Kara)	2–3, 49, 122, 388–389	6	4
44	Kwon Yu-ri (Girls' Generation)	16, 63–64, 254, 363, 602	6	4
44	Daesung (Big Bang)	35–36, 84–85, 163, 250	6	4
44	Jang Hyuk	44–45, 578, 640, 708-709	6	4
44	Sulli (f(x))	55, 75, 129, 152–154	6	4
44	Lee Dong-wook	133–134, 136, 179–180, 263	6	4
44	Yoo Byung-jae	243, 312, 390–392, 480	6	4
44	Kim Ji-min	278–279, 377, 416–417, 497	6	4
44	Hur Young-ji (Kara)	561, 567, 584–585, 606–607	6	4
53	Kim Soo-yong	271–272, 360–361, 529–530	6	3
54	Kim Je-dong	11, 21, 79, 106, 207	5	5
54	Choi Min-ho (Shinee)	75, 129, 201, 254, 323	5	5
54	Hwang Kwang-hee (ZE:A)	129, 236, 272, 662, 809	5	5
54	Eun Ji-won (Sechs Kies)	141, 209, 252, 326, 383	5	5
54	Hwang Chan-sung (2PM)	150, 162, 195, 201, 256	5	5
54	Jang Wooyoung (2PM)	162, 195, 210, 256, 548	5	5
54	Yura (Girl's Day)	162, 263, 322, 493, 823	5	5
54	Yoon Bo-ra (Sistar)	174, 201, 255, 307, 409	5	5
54	Kang Ha-neul	190, 240, 314, 362, 673	5	5
54	Jeon So-min	224, 343, 736, 774, 806	5	5
54	Jessi (Lucky J)	244, 252, 503, 514, 548	5	5
54	Chaeyoung (Twice)	302, 328, 398, 428, 506	5	5
54	Jeongyeon (Twice)	302, 328, 398, 428, 506	5	5
54	Jihyo (Twice)	302, 328, 398, 428, 506	5	5
54	Mina (Twice)	302, 328, 398, 428, 506	5	5
54	Momo (Twice)	302, 328, 398, 428, 506	5	5
54	Nayeon (Twice)	302, 328, 398, 428, 506	5	5
54	Sana (Twice)	302, 328, 398, 428, 506	5	5
54	Tzuyu (Twice)	302, 328, 398, 428, 506	5	5
54	Keum Sae-rok	442, 486, 546, 686, 719	5	5
54	Joo Hyun-young	684, 717, 728, 759, 828	5	5
54	Jonathan Yiombi	688, 697, 702, 720, 775	5	5
72	Kim Soo-ro	9, 67–68, 138, 262	5	4
72	Song Eun-i	24, 149, 211–212, 811	5	4
72	Uee (After School)	34, 137, 249, 271–272	5	4
72	Sunny (Girls' Generation)	39, 254, 363, 466–467	5	4
72	Ok Taec-yeon (2PM)	40, 150, 234–235, 256	5	4
72	IU	43, 77, 96–97, 168	5	4
72	Taeyeon (Girls' Generation)	63–64, 112, 254, 363	5	4
72	Hyoyeon (Girls' Generation)	63–64, 254, 363, 602	5	4
72	Hyolyn (Sistar)	75, 162, 307, 348–349	5	4
72	Ryu Hyun-jin	119, 172–173, 227, 534	5	4
72	Han Hye-jin	133–134, 136, 174, 317	5	4
72	Lee Jun-ho (2PM)	151–152, 195, 240, 256	5	4
72	Lee Guk-joo	205, 255, 405, 476–477	5	4
72	Jung Il-woo	242, 283, 289–290, 437	5	4
72	Jang Do-yeon	244, 323, 347–348, 419	5	4
72	Park Joon-hyung (g.o.d)	248, 260–261, 272, 522	5	4
72	Kim Jun-hyun	249, 271–272, 305, 323	5	4
72	Zico (Block B)	299, 496, 510, 708-709	5	4
72	Choi Soo-young (Girls' Generation)	254, 363, 431–432, 535, 784	5	4
72	Jinyoung (Got7)	272, 316, 418, 477–478	5	4
72	Hwang Chi-yeul	272, 409, 431–432, 471	5	4
72	Mingyu (Seventeen)	272, 448, 502, 529–530	5	4
93	Jessica Jung (Girls' Generation)	4–5, 63–64, 141	5	3
93	Ji Sung	54, 116–117, 202–203	5	3
93	Ji Jin-hee	76–77, 116–117, 308	5	3
93	Hyuna (4Minute)	93–94, 132, 476–477	5	3
93	Lee Seung-gi	120–121, 174, 228–229	5	3
93	Lee Si-young	131, 429–431, 533	5	3
93	Andy Lee (Shinhwa)	160–161, 236, 278–279	5	3
93	Lim Ju-hwan	192–194, 266, 271–272	5	3
93	Sung Hoon	317, 367–368, 431–432	5	3
93	Lee Elijah	367–368, 383, 416–417	5	3
93	Lee Yi-kyung	446–447, 501, 615–616	5	3
104	Code Kunst	458–459, 467–469	5	2
104	Go Young-bae (Soran)	458–459, 467–469	5	2
104	Gummy	458–459, 467–469	5	2
104	Lee Tae-wook (Soran)	458–459, 467–469	5	2
104	Nucksal	458–459, 467–469	5	2
104	Pyeon Yoo-il (Soran)	458–459, 467–469	5	2
104	Seo Myun-ho (Soran)	458–459, 467–469	5	2
111	Park Bo-young	25, 118, 181, 269	4	4
111	Go Ara	80, 139, 298, 437	4	4
111	Im Soo-hyang	80, 422, 453, 494	4	4
111	Lee Jong-hyun (CNBLUE)	127, 129, 138, 186	4	4
111	Jo Jung-chi (Shinchireem)	159, 195, 274, 312	4	4
111	Leeteuk (Super Junior)	221, 275, 376, 760	4	4
111	Hong Jong-hyun	230, 243, 314, 436	4	4
111	Hani (EXID)	237, 275, 448, 569	4	4
111	Jennie (Blackpink)	330, 409, 413, 525	4	4
111	Chung Ha	434, 457, 500, 801	4	4
111	Lee Do-hyun	496, 499, 510, 533	4	4
127	Park Ye-jin	37, 67–68, 241	4	3
127	Choi Min-soo	52–53, 69, 118	4	3
127	Shin Se-kyung	57–58, 103, 241	4	3
127	Lee Yeon-hee	61–62, 139, 535	4	3
127	Joo Sang-wook	76–77, 169, 219	4	3
127	G-Dragon (BigBang)	84–85, 163, 250	4	3
127	T.O.P (BigBang)	84–85, 170, 250	4	3
127	Krystal Jung (f(x))	93–94, 214, 797	4	3
127	Park Shin-hye	120–121, 166, 304	4	3
127	John Park	159, 179–180, 265	4	3
127	Kim Sung-kyu (Infinite)	162, 179–180, 201	4	3
127	Kim Kyung-ho	179–180, 221, 312	4	3
127	Sung Si-kyung	239, 556, 795-796	4	3
127	Byul	251, 429–430, 642	4	3
127	Park Ha-na	253, 431–432, 488	4	3
127	Lee Ha-neul (DJ DOC)	260–261, 272, 319	4	3
127	Yoon Park	268, 271–272, 345	4	3
127	Joy (Red Velvet)	268, 376, 426–427	4	3
127	Hoshi (Seventeen)	272, 529–530, 676	4	3
127	V (BTS)	300, 671, 682–683	4	3
127	Lee Joo-yeon	416–417, 816, 819	4	3
127	Lee Young-ji	514, 567, 571–572	4	3
127	Han Ji-eun	527, 658–659, 820	4	3
127	Yoo Seung-ho	674, 682–683, 752	4	3
148	Song Ji-hyo	2–3, 4–5	4	2
148	Kim Min-jong	22, 192–194	4	2
148	Lee Da-hae	82–83, 289–290	4	2
148	Han Hyo-joo	123–124, 151–152	4	2
148	Rain	188–189, 191, 214	4	2
148	Ryu Seung-soo	192–194, 204	4	2
148	Lim Seul-ong (2AM)	211–212, 271–272	4	2
148	Kim Yeon-koung	257, 572–574	4	2
148	Park Geun-sik	271–272, 360–361	4	2
148	B.I (iKon)	278–279, 416–417	4	2
148	Bobby (iKon)	278–279, 416–417	4	2
159	Park Jun-gyu	8, 34, 90	3	3
159	Shin Bong-sun	9, 43, 56	3	3
159	Lizzy (After School)	13, 14, 292	3	3
159	Jang Dong-min	13, 220, 532	3	3
159	Kim Hee-chul (Super Junior)	20, 207, 275	3	3
159	Choi Si-won (Super Junior)	22, 75, 135	3	3
159	Kim Sook	56, 149, 272	3	3
159	Gaeko (Dynamic Duo)	59, 86, 107	3	3
159	Park Sang-myun	90, 125, 159	3	3
159	Yoon Jong-shin	101, 195, 312	3	3
159	Yim Si-wan (ZE:A)	104, 182, 282	3	3
159	Choo Sung-hoon	131, 150, 637	3	3
159	Lee Kyung-kyu	143, 305, 317	3	3
159	Seo Jang-hoon	144, 309, 765	3	3
159	Sandara Park (2NE1)	156, 195, 345	3	3
159	Muzie	176, 195, 272	3	3
159	Son Ho-jun	184, 243, 752	3	3
159	Choi Yeo-jin	213, 527, 620	3	3
159	Jo Jung-suk	215, 327, 460	3	3
159	Kangnam (M.I.B)	220, 248, 522	3	3
159	Kim Min-kyo	220, 262, 272	3	3
159	Kyung Soo-jin	224, 299, 380	3	3
159	Nam Ji-hyun	237, 564, 712	3	3
159	Jang Su-won (Sechs Kies)	243, 326, 383	3	3
159	Tiffany Young (Girls' Generation)	254, 363, 471	3	3
159	Park Na-rae	268, 272, 321	3	3
159	BamBam (Got7)	272, 316, 418	3	3
159	Jackson Wang (Got7)	272, 316, 418	3	3
159	JB (Got7)	272, 316, 418	3	3
159	Mark Tuan (Got7)	272, 316, 418	3	3
159	Choi Young-jae (Got7)	272, 316, 418	3	3
159	Yugyeom (Got7)	272, 316, 418	3	3
159	Seungkwan (Seventeen)	272, 448, 676	3	3
159	Lim Ji-yeon	281, 320, 465	3	3
159	Park Mi-sun	287, 322, 495	3	3
159	Joohoney (Monsta X)	319, 661, 771	3	3
159	Jisoo (Blackpink)	330, 409, 525	3	3
159	KCM	339, 593, 611	3	3
159	Park Ji-hyun	475, 518, 692	3	3
159	Ahn Bo-hyun	497, 692, 814	3	3
159	Mimi (Oh My Girl)	677, 789, 807	3	3
159	Kim Ha-yun	716, 736, 766	3	3
159	Kim Min-jong	716, 766, 825	3	3
200	Kim Min-jung	50–51, 167	3	2
200	Kim Joo-hyuk	61–62, 65	3	2
200	Seohyun (Girls' Generation)	63–64, 254	3	2
200	Taeyang (BigBang)	84–85, 250	3	2
200	Son Yeon-jae	109–110, 322	3	2
200	Juvie Train (Buga Kingz)	125, 271–272	3	2
200	Jeon Hye-bin	145, 431–432	3	2
200	Jung Doo-hong	150, 271–272	3	2
200	Eric Mun (Shinhwa)	160–161, 236	3	2
200	Jun Jin (Shinhwa)	160–161, 236	3	2
200	Lee Min-woo (Shinhwa)	160–161, 236	3	2
200	Shin Hye-sung (Shinhwa)	160–161, 236	3	2
200	Kim Jae-kyung (Rainbow)	179–180, 504	3	2
200	Kim Ji-seok	190, 446–447	3	2
200	Ha Yeon-soo	198, 374–375	3	2
200	Fei (Miss A)	205, 234–235	3	2
200	Baek Ji-young	205, 367–368	3	2
200	Kim Won-hyo	210, 271–272	3	2
200	Ji Chang-wook	211–212, 507	3	2
200	Ailee	211–212, 522	3	2
200	Seo Woo	213, 234–235	3	2
200	Kim Ki-bang	214, 271–272	3	2
200	Cho Jin-woong	217, 303–304	3	2
200	Oh Yeon-seo	218, 310–311	3	2
200	Hwang Seung-eon	253, 367–368	3	2
200	Irene Kim	253, 588–589	3	2
200	Hyun Joo-yup	257, 271–272	3	2
200	Stephanie Kim (The Grace)	268, 278–279	3	2
200	M. TySON	271–272, 319	3	2
200	Ma Ah-sung	271–272, 319	3	2
200	Nam Chang-hee	292, 529–530	3	2
200	Kwon Yul	303–304, 437	3	2
200	Ha Jae-sook	310–311, 313	3	2
200	Kang Jae-joon	319, 708-709	3	2
200	Cheon Sung-moon (Song Ji-hyo's brother)	360–361, 401	3	2
200	Kang Daniel (Wanna One)	374–375, 495	3	2
200	Irene (Red Velvet)	376, 426–427	3	2
200	Kang Mi-na (Gugudan)	388–389, 471	3	2
200	Seo Eun-soo	405, 477–478	3	2
200	Han Sun-hwa (Secret)	431–432, 507	3	2
200	Bona (Cosmic Girls)	445–446, 746	3	2
200	Kang Tae-oh (5urprise)	483–484, 493	3	2
200	Jun Hyo-seong	483–484, 502	3	2
200	Kang So-ra	484–485, 804	3	2
200	Yoo Yeon-seok	535, 643–644	3	2
200	Cha Chung-hwa	540, 584–585	3	2
200	Jin Ji-hee	581, 595–596	3	2
200	Shin Ye-eun	649, 680–681	3	2
200	Lee Se-hee	658–659, 809	3	2
200	Sakura (Le Sserafim)	693–694, 745	3	2
251	Kim Jung-nan	192–194	3	1
251	Lee Sang-hwa	192–194	3	1
251	Oh Man-seok	192–194	3	1
251	Shorry J (Mighty Mouth)	390–392	3	1
251	Ahn Hye-jin	572–574	3	1
251	Kim Hee-jin	572–574	3	1
251	Lee So-young	572–574	3	1
251	Oh Ji-young	572–574	3	1
251	Park Eun-jin	572–574	3	1
251	Yeum Hye-seon	572–574	3	1
260	Son Dam-bi	6, 405	2	2
260	Hahm Eun-jung (T-ara)	7, 104	2	2
260	Lee Hong-gi (F.T. Island)	9, 242	2	2
260	Tony An	15, 32	2	2
260	Max Changmin (TVXQ)	27, 115	2	2
260	U-Know Yunho (TVXQ)	27, 115	2	2
260	Kim Byung-man	28, 145	2	2
260	Oh Ji-ho	33, 83	2	2
260	Ahn Mun-sook	56, 313	2	2
260	Simon Dominic (Supreme Team)	59, 127	2	2
260	Jo Hye-ryun	71, 811	2	2
260	Yoon Do-hyun	79, 101	2	2
260	Chun Jung-myung	92, 167	2	2
260	Kim Soo-hyun	102, 147	2	2
260	Yoo Jun-sang	103, 799	2	2
260	Yoon Doo-joon (Beast)	104, 162	2	2
260	Jeon Mi-seon	113, 158	2	2
260	Yoo Hae-jin	113, 320	2	2
260	Jin Se-yeon	119, 198	2	2
260	Shindong (Super Junior)	125, 765	2	2
260	Lee Gi-kwang (Beast)	127, 162	2	2
260	Park Shin-yang	128, 795	2	2
260	L (Infinite)	129, 162	2	2
260	Hwang Jung-min	132, 258	2	2
260	Park Sung-woong	132, 715	2	2
260	Lee Jong-suk	138, 181	2	2
260	Lee Sang-yoon	142, 190	2	2
260	Ryu Hyun-kyung	143, 272	2	2
260	Uhm Jung-hwa	146, 183	2	2
260	Lee Hyun-woo	147, 225	2	2
260	So Yi-hyun	148, 527	2	2
260	CL (2NE1)	156, 195	2	2
260	Minzy (2NE1)	156, 195	2	2
260	Park Bom (2NE1)	156, 195	2	2
260	Kim Hee-won	157, 269	2	2
260	Ahn Gil-kang	157, 287	2	2
260	Son Hyun-joo	158, 246	2	2
260	Jung-in	159, 221	2	2
260	Bang Min-ah (Girl's Day)	162, 198	2	2
260	Kim Da-som (Sistar)	162, 307	2	2
260	Yang Dong-geun	169, 532	2	2
260	Kim You-jung	170, 507	2	2
260	Jun Hyun-moo	176, 772	2	2
260	Lee Se-young	181, 343	2	2
260	Yeo Jin-goo	182, 302	2	2
260	Kang Min-hyuk (CNBLUE)	186, 201	2	2
260	Jun. K (2PM)	195, 256	2	2
260	Narsha (Brown Eyed Girls)	198, 221	2	2
260	Moon Hee-joon (H.O.T.)	209, 317	2	2
260	Kai (Exo)	209, 750	2	2
260	Yoo In-young	213, 299	2	2
260	Lee Yoo-ri	213, 436	2	2
260	Kim Sung-kyun	217, 298	2	2
260	Lee Sung-kyung	224, 304	2	2
260	Choi Tae-joon	230, 343	2	2
260	Niel (Teen Top)	233, 274	2	2
260	Lee Min-hyuk (BtoB)	233, 725	2	2
260	Jung So-min	237, 673	2	2
260	Ye Ji-won	238, 322	2	2
260	Park Cho-a (AOA)	244, 550	2	2
260	Jinu (Jinusean)	245, 272	2	2
260	Na Hae-ryung (Bestie)	253, 319	2	2
260	Do Sang-woo	253, 507	2	2
260	Sung Dong-il	264, 463	2	2
260	RM (BTS)	265, 300	2	2
260	Wax	272, 292	2	2
260	Zizo	272, 319	2	2
260	DK (Seventeen)	272, 676	2	2
260	Lee Seung-hyub (N.Flying)	272, 754	2	2
260	Roy Kim	272, 790	2	2
260	Hong Yoon-hwa (People Looking for a Laugh)	273, 319	2	2
260	Lee Eun-hyung (People Looking for a Laugh)	273, 319	2	2
260	Mino (Winner)	294, 402	2	2
260	Lee Je-hoon	298, 526	2	2
260	Jin (BTS)	300, 627	2	2
260	Lee Ki-woo	306, 309	2	2
260	Park Gyeong-ree (Nine Muses)	306, 405	2	2
260	Shownu (Monsta X)	307, 319	2	2
260	Kim Se-jeong (Gugudan)	313, 377	2	2
260	Yang Se-chan	321, 323	2	2
260	Gary (Leessang)	325, 336	2	2
260	Kang Sung-hoon (Sechs Kies)	326, 383	2	2
260	Kim Jae-duc (Sechs Kies)	326, 383	2	2
260	Lee Jai-jin (Sechs Kies)	326, 383	2	2
260	Lisa (Blackpink)	330, 525	2	2
260	Rosé (Blackpink)	330, 525	2	2
260	Shin Sung-rok	372, 799	2	2
260	Shin Hye-jeong (AOA)	402, 481	2	2
260	Han Eun-jung	409, 442	2	2
260	Kwak Si-yang	414, 501	2	2
260	Kim Do-yeon (Weki Meki)	434, 513	2	2
260	Lee Dong-hwi	435, 450	2	2
260	Gong Myung (5urprise)	435, 803	2	2
260	Shin Ji-min (AOA)	436, 481	2	2
260	Kim Hye-yoon	448, 787	2	2
260	Kim Kyung-nam	449, 806	2	2
260	Kim Hye-jun	463, 813	2	2
260	Hwang Bo-ra	474, 482	2	2
260	Hong Hyun-hee	475, 497	2	2
260	Jang Won-young (Ive)	513, 639	2	2
260	Jeon So-mi	514, 801	2	2
260	Lee Joo-bin	527, 805	2	2
260	Huening Kai (TXT)	532, 685	2	2
260	Yeonjun (TXT)	532, 685	2	2
260	Ahn Eun-jin	541, 778	2	2
260	Yoon Jong-hoon	542, 675	2	2
260	Jang Dong-yoon	546, 767	2	2
260	Lee Yong-jin	556, 565	2	2
260	San (Ateez)	581, 820	2	2
260	Byeon Woo-seok	601, 704	2	2
260	Manny Pacquiao	626, 651	2	2
260	Kim Ji-eun	630, 816	2	2
260	An Yu-jin (Ive)	639, 705	2	2
260	Rei (Ive)	639, 705	2	2
260	Roh Yoon-seo	645, 726	2	2
260	Ma Sun-ho	697, 702	2	2
260	Seo Eun-kwang (BtoB)	701, 725	2	2
260	Joo Jong-hyuk	702, 740	2	2
260	Park Hye-jeong	716, 736	2	2
260	Park Eun-tae	738, 799	2	2
368	Kim Hyun-joong (SS501)	46–47	2	1
368	Kang Ji-young (Kara)	61–62	2	1
368	Kim Suna	65–66	2	1
368	Lee Min-jung	72–73	2	1
368	Kim Sung-soo	76–77	2	1
368	BoA	88–89	2	1
368	Jung Jae-hyung	88–89	2	1
368	Han Seung-yeon (Kara)	93–94	2	1
368	Park Gyu-ri (Kara)	93–94	2	1
368	Han Ji-min	105–106	2	1
368	Park Tae-hwan	109–110	2	1
368	Ko Chang-seok	111–112	2	1
368	Lee Jong-won	111–112	2	1
368	Shin Jung-geun	111–112	2	1
368	Son Byong-ho	111–112	2	1
368	Moon Geun-young	114–115	2	1
368	Song Chang-eui	116–117	2	1
368	Go Soo	123–124	2	1
368	Choi Ji-woo	126–127	2	1
368	Jung Woo-sung	151–152	2	1
368	Koo Ja-cheol	152–153	2	1
368	Song Kyung-ah	179–180	2	1
368	Baek Sung-hyun	202–203	2	1
368	Cha Yu-ram	202–203	2	1
368	Fabien Yoon	202–203	2	1
368	Ju Ji-hoon	202–203	2	1
368	Sam Okyere	202–203	2	1
368	Kim Tae-woo (g.o.d)	211–212	2	1
368	Lee Sung-jae	211–212	2	1
368	Skull	211–212	2	1
368	Moon Chae-won	228–229	2	1
368	Kim Sung-ryung	234–235	2	1
368	Shoo	234–235	2	1
368	Yoo Sun	234–235	2	1
368	Yeon Jung-hoon	234–235	2	1
368	Kim Gun-mo	260–261	2	1
368	Koo Jun-yup	260–261	2	1
368	Lee Jae-hoon (Cool)	260–261	2	1
368	Chang Jung-koo	271–272	2	1
368	Chi In-jin	271–272	2	1
368	Choi Kyung-ho	271–272	2	1
368	DJ Pumpkin (AOMG)	271–272	2	1
368	DJR2	271–272	2	1
368	Go Woo-ri (Rainbow)	271–272	2	1
368	Heo Tae-hee	271–272	2	1
368	Hwang Choong-jae	271–272	2	1
368	Im Hyung-joon	271–272	2	1
368	Jung Tae-ho	271–272	2	1
368	Kim Ki-tae	271–272	2	1
368	King Kong	271–272	2	1
368	Lee Jung	271–272	2	1
368	Lee Sang-ho	271–272	2	1
368	Lee Sang-min	271–272	2	1
368	Lee Won-hee	271–272	2	1
368	Linda (Rapercussion)	271–272	2	1
368	Mino (Free Style)	271–272	2	1
368	Noh Ji-sim	271–272	2	1
368	Nuol	271–272	2	1
368	Oh Jung-suk	271–272	2	1
368	Recto Luz (Rapercussion)	271–272	2	1
368	Sam Hammington	271–272	2	1
368	San	271–272	2	1
368	Shim Hyung-tak	271–272	2	1
368	Superbee	271–272	2	1
368	Taemi	271–272	2	1
368	Wang-bae	271–272	2	1
368	Yang Sang-guk	271–272	2	1
368	Youngjun (Brown Eyed Soul)	271–272	2	1
368	Yui-yeop	271–272	2	1
368	Zion Luz (Rapercussion)	271–272	2	1
368	Chae-yeon	278–279	2	1
368	Kim Jung-nam (Turbo)	278–279	2	1
368	Lee Ji-hyun	278–279	2	1
368	Lee Jong-soo	278–279	2	1
368	Ji So-yun	283–284	2	1
368	Jong Tae-se	283–284	2	1
368	Ahn Sung-ki	303–304	2	1
368	Han Ye-ri	303–304	2	1
368	Soo Ae	310–311	2	1
368	Lee Sun-bin	356–357	2	1
368	Lee Tae-hwan (5urprise)	356–357	2	1
368	Son Yeo-eun	356–357	2	1
368	Jeon Wook-min (Jeon So-min's brother)	360–361	2	1
368	Kim Jong-myung (Kim Jong-kook's brother)	360–361	2	1
368	Tae Hang-ho	360–361	2	1
368	Kei (Lovelyz)	367–368	2	1
368	Sol Bi	367–368	2	1
368	Lee Si-a	416–417	2	1
368	Jang Hee-jin	445–446	2	1
368	Kim Jae-young	445–446	2	1
368	Lia Kim	454–455	2	1
368	Jang Ye-won	466–467	2	1
368	Kim Ye-won	466–467	2	1
368	Kim Si-hyeon (Everglow)	476–477	2	1
368	Choi Ri	477–478	2	1
368	YOYOMI	483–484	2	1
368	Ahn Jae-hong	484–485	2	1
368	Jeon Yeo-been	484–485	2	1
368	Kim Sung-oh	484–485	2	1
368	Bae Jong-ok	491–492	2	1
368	Shin Hye-sun	491–492	2	1
368	Ji Yi-soo	497–498	2	1
368	Song Jin-woo	497–498	2	1
368	Eugene	530–531	2	1
368	Kim So-yeon	530–531	2	1
368	Lee Ji-ah	530–531	2	1
368	Jung Hye-in	551–552	2	1
368	Lee Cho-hee	551–552	2	1
368	Lee Sang-joon (Comedian)	571–572	2	1
368	Lee Hyun-yi	588–589	2	1
368	Song Hae-na	588–589	2	1
368	Hong Soo-ah	589–590	2	1
368	Bae Seul-ki	589–590	2	1
368	Cha Jun-hwan	595–596	2	1
368	Jukjae	632–633	2	1
368	Be'O	632–633	2	1
368	Dex	658–659	2	1
368	Kim Chaewon (Le Sserafim)	693–694	2	1
368	Kazuha (Le Sserafim)	693–694	2	1
368	Hwang Hee-chan	708–709	2	1
368	Kim Ha-neul	762–763	2	1
368	Lee Jun-young	762–763	2	1
368	Nam Woo-hyun (Infinite)	762–763	2	1
368	Lee Chang-sub (BtoB)	795–796	2	1
481	Hwang Jung-eum	1	1	
481	Lee Hyo-ri	1	1	
481	Kim Shin-young	6	1	
481	Se7en	6	1	
481	Jo Kwon (2AM)	7	1	
481	Victoria Song (f(x))	8	1	
481	Yoon Se-ah	10	1	
481	Ko Joo-won	17	1	
481	Shim Hyung-rae	23	1	
481	Lee Kyung-shil	24	1	
481	Jung Jin-young	26	1	
481	Lee Moon-sik	26	1	
481	Hyun Young	31	1	
481	Lee Sun-kyun	41	1	
481	Park Joong-hoon	41	1	
481	Yoon So-yi	53	1	
481	Choi Kang-hee	54	1	
481	Park Ji-yeon (T-ara)	55	1	
481	Luna (f(x))	55	1	
481	Yang Jung-a	56	1	
481	Choiza (Dynamic Duo)	59	1	
481	Tiger JK (Drunken Tiger)	59	1	
481	Yoon Mi-rae	59	1	
481	Song Joong-ki	66	1	
481	Lee Min-ki	70	1	
481	Park Chul-min	70	1	
481	Son Ye-jin	70	1	
481	Oh Yeon-soo	71	1	
481	Ahn So-hee (Wonder Girls)	75	1	
481	Hong Soo-hyun	78	1	
481	Lee Beom-soo	78	1	
481	Hyomin (T-ara)	80	1	
481	Ha Ji-won	86	1	
481	Han Ga-in	87	1	
481	Lee Deok-hwa	90	1	
481	Park Jin-young	92	1	
481	Im Ho	99	1	
481	Lee Tae-gon	99	1	
481	Kim Hee-sun	100	1	
481	Kim Bum-soo	101	1	
481	Jang Shin-young	107	1	
481	Kim Sang-joong	107	1	
481	Gong Hyo-jin	108	1	
481	Im Ha-ryong	111	1	
481	Yum Jung-ah	113	1	
481	Kim Yu-bin (Wonder Girls)	117	1	
481	Choo Shin-soo	119	1	
481	Jung Won-gwan (Sobangcha)	122	1	
481	Kang Susie	122	1	
481	Kim Tae-hyung (Sobangcha)	122	1	
481	Kim Wan-sun	122	1	
481	Lee Sang-won (Sobangcha)	122	1	
481	Park Nam-jung	122	1	
481	Jeong Hyeong-don	125	1	
481	Ryu Dam	125	1	
481	Uhm Ji-won	128	1	
481	Jackie Chan	135	1	
481	Min Hyo-rin	138	1	
481	Lee Bo-young	142	1	
481	Kim In-kwon	143	1	
481	Cha In-pyo	144	1	
481	Ricky Kim	144	1	
481	Jung Jin-woon (2AM)	145	1	
481	Noh Woo-jin	145	1	
481	Park Jung-chul	145	1	
481	Kim Sang-kyung	146	1	
481	Jeong Jun-ha	148	1	
481	Kim Soo-mi	149	1	
481	Kwon Ri-se (Ladies' Code)	149	1	
481	Park So-hyun	149	1	
481	Patrice Evra	154	1	
481	Jung Woong-in	157	1	
481	Moon Jeong-hee	158	1	
481	Lim Kim (Togeworl)	159	1	
481	Sayuri Fujita	159	1	
481	Seung-ho (MBLAQ)	162	1	
481	Kim Hae-sook	164	1	
481	Yoo Ah-in	164	1	
481	Choi Jin-hyuk	166	1	
481	Park Myeong-su	168	1	
481	Yoon Je-moon	170	1	
481	Gong Yoo	175	1	
481	Park Hee-soon	175	1	
481	Jang Ki-ha	176	1	
481	Lee Juck	176	1	
481	Gill (Leessang)	177	1	
481	Do-hee	182	1	
481	Jo Min-su	183	1	
481	Moon So-ri	183	1	
481	Baro (B1A4)	184	1	
481	Kang Ye-won	184	1	
481	Seo In-guk	184	1	
481	Lee Jung-shin (CNBLUE)	186	1	
481	Shim Eun-kyung	186	1	
481	Gong Hyung-jin	190	1	
481	Kwon Hae-hyo	190	1	
481	Ku Hye-sun	190	1	
481	Choi Hee	198	1	
481	Han Hye-jin	198	1	
481	Hoya (Infinite)	201	1	
481	Jinyoung (B1A4)	201	1	
481	Kang Seung-hyun	205	1	
481	Hong Seok-cheon	206	1	
481	Joo Won	206	1	
481	Lee So-yeon	207	1	
481	Nam Hee-suk	207	1	
481	Chun Myung-hoon (NRG)	209	1	
481	Danny Ahn (g.o.d)	209	1	
481	Sehun (Exo)	209	1	
481	Taemin (Shinee)	209	1	
481	Choi Bu-kyung (Seoul SK Knights)	210	1	
481	Kim Hwan	210	1	
481	Lee Hye-jeong	210	1	
481	Yook Jook-wan	210	1	
481	Kim Min-seo	213	1	
481	Alex	214	1	
481	Park Young-gyu	214	1	
481	Shin Min-a	215	1	
481	Oh Sang-jin	217	1	
481	Kim Ji-hoon	218	1	
481	Han Sang-jin	219	1	
481	Han Ye-seul	219	1	
481	Jung Gyu-woon	219	1	
481	Wang Ji-hye	219	1	
481	Song Jae-rim	220	1	
481	Bobby Kim	221	1	
481	Kim Yeon-woo	221	1	
481	Han Groo	224	1	
481	Song Ga-yeon	224	1	
481	Kang Hye-jung	226	1	
481	Kim Hye-ja	226	1	
481	Kang Jung-ho	227	1	
481	Lee Seo-jin	229	1	
481	Nam Joo-hyuk	230	1	
481	Seo Ha-joon	230	1	
481	Seo Kang-joon (5urprise)	230	1	
481	Hong Kyung-min	232	1	
481	Kim Ji-soo	232	1	
481	Kim Won-jun	232	1	
481	Miryo (Brown Eyed Girls)	232	1	
481	Oh Hyun-kyung	232	1	
481	Park Ji-yoon	232	1	
481	Shin Da-eun	232	1	
481	Jang Dong-woo (Infinite)	233	1	
481	Son Dong-woon (Beast)	233	1	
481	Eric Nam	233	1	
481	N (VIXX)	233	1	
481	Kim Ryeo-wook (Super Junior)	233	1	
481	Sohyun (4Minute)	233	1	
481	Sojin (Girl's Day)	233	1	
481	Jung Hee-cheol (ZE:A)	236	1	
481	Kim Dongwan (Shinhwa)	236	1	
481	Kim Tae-heon (ZE:A)	236	1	
481	Lee Hoo (ZE:A)	236	1	
481	Park Hyung-sik (ZE:A)	236	1	
481	Yerin (GFriend)	237	1	
481	Yoon So-hee	237	1	
481	Kim Seo-hyung	238	1	
481	Yoon Jin-seo	241	1	
481	Kang Kyun-sung	243	1	
481	Kim Yoo-ri	244	1	
481	Seo Yea-ji	244	1	
481	Sean (Jinusean)	245	1	
481	Amber Liu (f(x))	248	1	
481	Henry Lau (Super Junior-M)	248	1	
481	Kim So-hyun	251	1	
481	Son Jun-ho	251	1	
481	Jay Park	252	1	
481	San E	252	1	
481	Verbal Jint	252	1	
481	Seo Hyun-jin	253	1	
481	Yeeun (CLC)	253	1	
481	Baek Jin-hee	256	1	
481	Shin Soo-ji	257	1	
481	Song Jong-gook	257	1	
481	Jang Yoon-ju	258	1	
481	Jung Man-sik	258	1	
481	Cha Ye-ryun	259	1	
481	Lee Yo-won	259	1	
481	Kang Sung-jin	262	1	
481	Nam Bo-ra	262	1	
481	Park Gun-hyung	262	1	
481	Kwon Sang-woo	264	1	
481	Park Ye-eun (Wonder Girls)	265	1	
481	Gong Seung-yeon	268	1	
481	Hwang Seok-jeong	268	1	
481	Jung Kyung-ho	268	1	
481	Kim Ja-in	268	1	
481	Park Han-byul	268	1	
481	Byun Seung-yoon	272	1	
481	Cha Hun (N.Flying)	272	1	
481	Cho Yoon-woo	272	1	
481	Digili (Honey Family)	272	1	
481	Dino (Seventeen)	272	1	
481	Ducky	272	1	
481	Hyun Woo	272	1	
481	Jeonghan (Seventeen)	272	1	
481	Joshua (Seventeen)	272	1	
481	Jun (Seventeen)	272	1	
481	Jung Dong-hyun	272	1	
481	Kim Chang-keun	272	1	
481	Kim Jae-hyun (N.Flying)	272	1	
481	Kim Ji-an	272	1	
481	Kwon Kwang-jin (N.Flying)	272	1	
481	Lee Sung-mi	272	1	
481	Moon Ji-ae	272	1	
481	S.Coups (Seventeen)	272	1	
481	Sa Sung-woong	272	1	
481	The8 (Seventeen)	272	1	
481	Tim	272	1	
481	Vernon (Seventeen)	272	1	
481	Wonwoo (Seventeen)	272	1	
481	Woozi (Seventeen)	272	1	
481	Jung Chan-woo (Cultwo)	273	1	
481	Kim Jung-hwan (People Looking for a Laugh)	273	1	
481	Kim Tae-gyun (Cultwo)	273	1	
481	Kim Tae-hwan (People Looking for a Laugh)	273	1	
481	Min Kyung-hoon (Buzz)	274	1	
481	Lim Yo-hwan	275	1	
481	Go Ah-sung	282	1	
481	Lee Hee-joon	282	1	
481	Kim Ga-yeon	286	1	
481	Kim Do-kyun	287	1	
481	Kim Jo-han	287	1	
481	Kim Won-hae	287	1	
481	Lee Hong-ryul	287	1	
481	Yoo Yul	287	1	
481	Jeong Jeong-ah	292	1	
481	Kang Hyeon-soo	292	1	
481	Lee Wan	292	1	
481	Mikey (Turbo)	292	1	
481	Park Myeong-ho	292	1	
481	Lee Hye-ri (Girl's Day)	294	1	
481	Nam Tae-hyun (Winner)	294	1	
481	Eunseo (Cosmic Girls)	297	1	
481	Jin Goo	297	1	
481	Kim Ji-won	297	1	
481	Jo Bo-ah	299	1	
481	Stephanie Lee	299	1	
481	Uhm Hyun-kyung	299	1	
481	Suga (BTS)	300	1	
481	J-Hope (BTS)	300	1	
481	Jimin (BTS)	300	1	
481	Jungkook (BTS)	300	1	
481	Kim Min-seok	304	1	
481	Yoon Kyun-sang	304	1	
481	Lee Jung-jin	305	1	
481	Lee Soo-min	305	1	
481	Yoo Jae-hwan	305	1	
481	Kim Hee-ae	308	1	
481	Hong Jin-kyung	309	1	
481	Bada	312	1	
481	Lee Joon-gi	314	1	
481	Cha Seung-won	315	1	
481	Key (Shinee)	317	1	
481	Yoon Hyung-bin	317	1	
481	A-Tom (Topp Dogg)	319	1	
481	B-Joo (Topp Dogg)	319	1	
481	Buffy (Madtown)	319	1	
481	Chae Soo-bin	319	1	
481	Chan-yong (100%)	319	1	
481	Chang-sun (24K)	319	1	
481	Cho Jae-hyun	319	1	
481	Cory (24K)	319	1	
481	Da-hye (Bestie)	319	1	
481	Dae-won (Madtown)	319	1	
481	Dino (HALO)	319	1	
481	FeelDog (Big Star)	319	1	
481	Haebin (Gugudan)	319	1	
481	Hana (Gugudan)	319	1	
481	Han-sol (Topp Dogg)	319	1	
481	Hee-chun (HALO)	319	1	
481	Hee-jun (KNK)	319	1	
481	Heo-jun (Madtown)	319	1	
481	Ho-joon (Topp Dogg)	319	1	
481	Hong-seob (24K)	319	1	
481	Hui (24K)	319	1	
481	Hyeyeon (Gugudan)	319	1	
481	Hyuk (VIXX)	319	1	
481	Hyuk-jin (100%)	319	1	
481	Hyun-kyung (ROMEO)	319	1	
481	Hyungwon (Monsta X)	319	1	
481	H.O (Madtown)	319	1	
481	In-haeng (HALO)	319	1	
481	I.M (Monsta X)	319	1	
481	In-seong (KNK)	319	1	
481	Jae-yong (HALO)	319	1	
481	Jang Hong-je	319	1	
481	Jang Jae-young	319	1	
481	Jeong-uk (24K)	319	1	
481	Ji-hun (KNK)	319	1	
481	Jin-hong (24K)	319	1	
481	Jong-hwan (100%)	319	1	
481	Joon-Hyeon (ALL-STAR)	319	1	
481	Jude (Big Star)	319	1	
481	Kang Hye-yeon (Bestie)	319	1	
481	Kang-min (ROMEO)	319	1	
481	Ken (VIXX)	319	1	
481	Kihyun (Monsta X)	319	1	
481	Ki-su (24K)	319	1	
481	Kim Chang-ryeol (DJ DOC)	319	1	
481	Kim Kyung-jin	319	1	
481	Kim Min-ki	319	1	
481	Kim Sung-ki	319	1	
481	Kyle (ROMEO)	319	1	
481	Lee Dong-yeob	319	1	
481	Lee-geon (Madtown)	319	1	
481	Lee Ho-chan	319	1	
481	Lee Soo-han	319	1	
481	Maeng Seung-ji	319	1	
481	Milo (ROMEO)	319	1	
481	Mimi (Gugudan)	319	1	
481	Minhyuk (Monsta X)	319	1	
481	Minsung (ROMEO)	319	1	
481	Min-woo (100%)	319	1	
481	Moos (Madtown)	319	1	
481	Na-young (Gugudan)	319	1	
481	Nakta (Topp Dogg)	319	1	
481	Noah (ALL-STAR)	319	1	
481	Oh Bok-nam	319	1	
481	Ooon (HALO)	319	1	
481	P-Goon (Topp Dogg)	319	1	
481	Pabi (ALL-STAR)	319	1	
481	Rae-hwan (Big Star)	319	1	
481	Ravi (VIXX)	319	1	
481	Rok-hyun (100%)	319	1	
481	Sally Liu (Gugudan)	319	1	
481	Sang-ho (Snuper)	319	1	
481	Sang-il (Snuper)	319	1	
481	Se-bin (Snuper)	319	1	
481	Seung-hwan (ROMEO)	319	1	
481	Seung-jun (KNK)	319	1	
481	So-yee (Gugudan)	319	1	
481	Son Min-hyuk	319	1	
481	Su-hyun (Snuper)	319	1	
481	Sung-hak (Big Star)	319	1	
481	Tae-woong (Snuper)	319	1	
481	U-Ji (Bestie)	319	1	
481	Wonho	319	1	
481	Woo-seong (Snuper)	319	1	
481	Xero (Topp Dogg)	319	1	
481	Yano (Topp Dogg)	319	1	
481	Yoon-dong (HALO)	319	1	
481	Yunsung (ROMEO)	319	1	
481	You-jin (KNK)	319	1	
481	Jo Yoon-hee	320	1	
481	Lee Kyu-han	321	1	
481	Solbin (Laboum)	321	1	
481	Kang Min-kyung (Davichi)	322	1	
481	Seo Ji-hye	323	1	
481	Hwang Woo-seul-hye	326	1	
481	D.O (Exo)	327	1	
481	Kim So-hyun	331	1	
481	Kim Won-hee	339	1	
481	Kim Yong-man	339	1	
481	Park Jin-joo	343	1	
481	Umji (GFriend)	343	1	
481	Choi Min-yong	344	1	
481	Han Jae-suk	345	1	
481	Jung Hye-sung	355	1	
481	Lee Donghae (Super Junior)	376	1	
481	Yesung (Super Junior)	376	1	
481	Im Se-mi	377	1	
481	Ko Sung-hee	377	1	
481	Choi Gwi-hwa	381	1	
481	Go Bo-gyeol	381	1	
481	Heo Sung-tae	381	1	
481	Han Ki-bum	401	1	
481	Han Mi-gwan	401	1	
481	Jo Woo-jong	401	1	
481	Kim Ok-Jeong (Haha's mother)	401	1	
481	K.Will	401	1	
481	Lee Jong-hyuk	401	1	
481	Seo Ji-seok	401	1	
481	Dayoung (Cosmic Girls)	402	1	
481	JooE (Momoland)	402	1	
481	Kang Seung-yoon (Winner)	402	1	
481	Pyo Ye-jin	409	1	
481	Jin Ki-joo	413	1	
481	Kim Roi-ha	414	1	
481	Seo Hyo-rim	414	1	
481	Lee Ha-na	422	1	
481	Ahn Hyo-seop	424	1	
481	Seo Young-hee	424	1	
481	Kim Byeong-ok	425	1	
481	Jin Seon-kyu	435	1	
481	Lee Hanee	435	1	
481	Ryu Seung-ryong	435	1	
481	Jeong Yu-mi	436	1	
481	Kwon Mina (AOA)	436	1	
481	Park Hoon	437	1	
481	Ha Seok-jin	447	1	
481	Han Bo-reum	448	1	
481	Heo Sol-ji (EXID)	448	1	
481	Esom	449	1	
481	Jang Jin-hee	461	1	
481	Rothy	461	1	
481	Seunghee (Oh My Girl)	461	1	
481	Song Ji-in	461	1	
481	Bae Seong-woo	463	1	
481	Cho Yi-hyun	463	1	
481	Choi Yu-hwa	465	1	
481	Park Jeong-min	465	1	
481	Park Yoo-na	471	1	
481	Go Min-si	474	1	
481	Lee Hee-jin	480	1	
481	YooA (Oh My Girl)	480	1	
481	Chanmi (AOA)	481	1	
481	Yuna (AOA)	481	1	
481	Lee Joo-young	486	1	
481	Kim Na-hee	493	1	
481	Lee Na-eun (April)	493	1	
481	Jo Byung-gyu	494	1	
481	Hwang Young-hee	495	1	
481	Lee Il-hwa	495	1	
481	Ong Seong-wu (Wanna One)	496	1	
481	Seo Ji-hoon	496	1	
481	Lee Joo-young	498	1	
481	Rowoon (SF9)	499	1	
481	Choi Yoo-jung (Weki Meki)	500	1	
481	Ha Yeon-joo	501	1	
481	Park Hyo-joo	501	1	
481	Ahn Ji-young (Bolbbalgan4)	503	1	
481	BewhY	503	1	
481	Hyojung (Oh My Girl)	503	1	
481	Lee Jin-hyuk (UP10TION)	503	1	
481	Kim Min-kyu	504	1	
481	Shim Eun-woo	504	1	
481	Song Yuqi (I-dle)	513	1	
481	Solar (MAMAMOO)	514	1	
481	Ji Seung-hyun	515	1	
481	Kim Yong-ji	515	1	
481	Kim Young-min	515	1	
481	Kim Dae-myung	516	1	
481	Kim Sang-ho	516	1	
481	Kwak Do-won	516	1	
481	Kim Min-jae	518	1	
481	Kim Sung-cheol	518	1	
481	Park Eun-bin	518	1	
481	Yiren (Everglow)	522	1	
481	Im Won-hee	526	1	
481	Lee Jin-wook	533	1	
481	Song Kang	533	1	
481	Kim Kwang-hyun	534	1	
481	Yoo Teo	535	1	
481	Defconn	539	1	
481	Kim Bo-sung	539	1	
481	Kim Jae-hwa	540	1	
481	Shin Dong-mi	540	1	
481	Bae Yoon-kyung	541	1	
481	Lee Sang-yi	541	1	
481	Park Eun-seok	542	1	
481	Park Sung-hoon	546	1	
481	Eunji (Brave Girls)	549	1	
481	Minyoung (Brave Girls)	549	1	
481	Yujeong (Brave Girls)	549	1	
481	Yuna (Brave Girls)	549	1	
481	Han Chae-young	561	1	
481	Chae Jong-hyeop	564	1	
481	Park Ki-woong	569	1	
481	Yoon Shi-yoon	569	1	
481	Jeong Jun-ha	576	1	
481	Luda (WJSN)	576	1	
481	Bibi	576	1	
481	Yeji (Itzy)	576	1	
481	Kim Jun-ho	577	1	
481	Aiki	579	1	
481	Honey J	579	1	
481	Monica	579	1	
481	Leejung	579	1	
481	Arin (Oh My Girl)	581	1	
481	Park Se-ri	591	1	
481	Parc Jae-jung	593	1	
481	Wonstein	593	1	
481	Kim Hee-jung	597	1	
481	Park Ah-in	597	1	
481	Roh Jeong-eui	597	1	
481	Park Kyung-hye	601	1	
481	Cho Jun-ho	602	1	
481	Cho Jun-hyun	602	1	
481	Cha Eun-woo (Astro)	604	1	
481	Moonbin (Astro)	604	1	
481	Yoon San-ha (Astro)	604	1	
481	Hong Ye-ji	605	1	
481	Kim Ji-young	605	1	
481	Hwang Seok-jeong	605	1	
481	Mirani	611	1	
481	Jin Seo-yeon	620	1	
481	Ok Ja-yeon	620	1	
481	Jung Sang-hoon	629	1	
481	Kim Rae-won	629	1	
481	Park Byung-eun	629	1	
481	Choi Doo-ho	637	1	
481	Jung Chan-sung	637	1	
481	Kim Shin-rok	638	1	
481	Gaeul (Ive)	639	1	
481	Leeseo (Ive)	639	1	
481	Liz (Ive)	639	1	
481	Donnie Yen	640	1	
481	Seogy	642	1	
481	Ryan Bang	651	1	
481	Yun Sung-bin	661	1	
481	Lee Dae-ho	662	1	
481	Kim Dong-hwi	674	1	
481	Yoo Su-bin	674	1	
481	Uhm Ki-joon	675	1	
481	Tsuki (Billlie)	684	1	
481	Soobin (TXT)	685	1	
481	Beomgyu (TXT)	685	1	
481	Taehyun (TXT)	685	1	
481	Noh Sang-hyun	686	1	
481	Eom Ji-yoon	687	1	
481	Lee Eun-ji	694	1	
481	Bae Hye-ji	701	1	
481	Yoon Kyung-ho	715	1	
481	Oh Sang-uk	716	1	
481	Park Sang-won	716	1	
481	Haewon (Nmixx)	721	1	
481	Lee Yoo-mi	724	1	
481	Woo Do-hwan	724	1	
481	Kim Min-ju	726	1	
481	Hong Kyung	726	1	
481	Rami (Babymonster)	727	1	
481	Rora (Babymonster)	727	1	
481	Lee Seok-hoon	738	1	
481	Jang Seong-woo	743	1	
481	Park Ji-won	743	1	
481	Eunchae (Le Sserafim)	745	1	
481	Sunjae (BtoB)	746	1	
481	Soyeon (I-dle)	753	1	
481	Park Ji-hu	754	1	
481	Asa (Babymonster)	759	1	
481	Ahyeon (Babymonster)	759	1	
481	Shin Gi-ru	765	1	
481	Jung Seung-hwan	772	1	
481	Bang Hyo-rin	773	1	
481	Byun Yo-han	773	1	
481	Kim Kang-woo	773	1	
481	Yang Se-jong	773	1	
481	Yang Se-hyung	774	1	
481	Kim Byung-chul	777	1	
481	Kim Mu-jun	778	1	
481	Solomon Park	787	1	
481	Choi Min-jeong	794	1	
481	Lee Jeong-min	794	1	
481	Lee June-seo	794	1	
481	Noh Do-hee	794	1	
481	Shin Dong-min	794	1	
481	Jung Woo	797	1	
481	Shin Seung-ho	797	1	
481	Hwasa (Mamamoo)	798	1	
481	Young K (Day6)	798	1	
481	Chae Won-bin	802	1	
481	Kim Min-seok (Melomance)	802	1	
481	Yoo Hee-kwan	802	1	
481	Ahn Jae-hyun	804	1	
481	Minnie (I-dle)	810	1	
481	Cha Woo-min	813	1	
481	Jung Eun-chae	814	1	
481	Kang Sang-jun	814	1	
481	Kim Shin-bi	814	1	
481	Kim Ji-yu	815	1	
481	Kim Won-hun	818	1	
481	Lee Hyun-jung (basketball)	825	1	
481	Lee E-dam	826	1	
481	Kang Ki-young	828	1	

== Reception ==
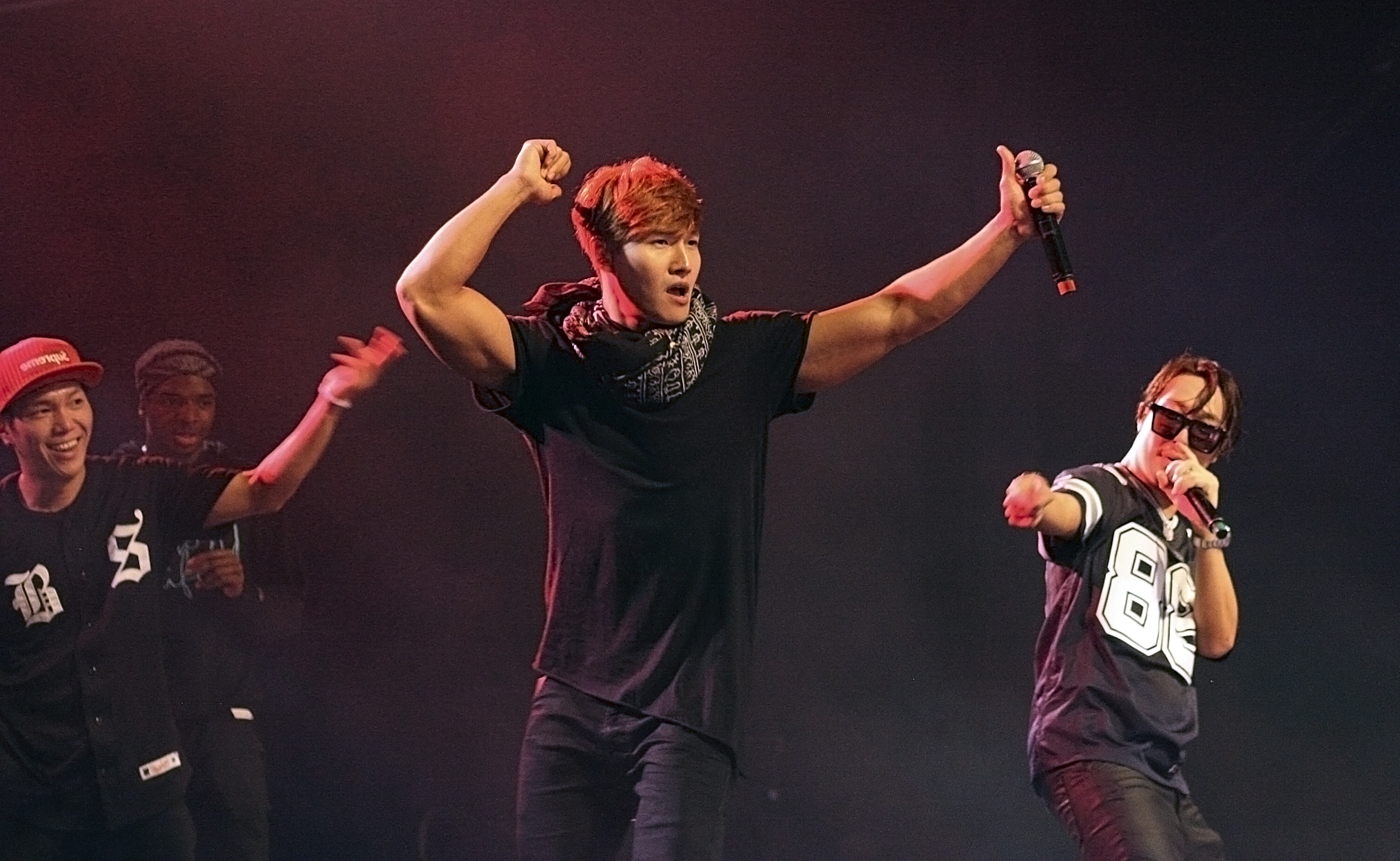
Kim Jong-kook (middle) and Haha (right) in Dallas in 2014, at a Running Man Brothers concert

The first episode of the show received mixed reviews. According to Asiae, the show concept was promising, but the crew could not use the location to full potential, and the pace was not fast and dynamic enough.

Despite a slow start, Running Man became increasingly popular in South Korea and throughout Asia. In its home country, the show was watched by 2.1 million people on average. Due to the existence of fansubs, it is watched outside of Asia as well, being translated into English, Spanish and Arabic, among others.

According to Singaporean daily newspaper The Straits Times, the popularity of the show is due to its unpredictability, the comedy involved, the celebrity guests and the chemistry between the regular cast members. Assistant professor Liew Kai Khiun at the Nanyang Technological University in Singapore attributes the appeal of Running Man to the ability of using public space in a creative way: "Running Man is about taking audiences to the various corners of not only South Korea, but the region as well. In the rather fast-paced urban societies in Asia, the show helps to provide release from the daily tensions that such streets and buildings are associated with." Liew thinks that the cast members are not particularly good looking, thus have nothing to lose, even if they "wrestle with one another like children".

According to producer Jo Hyo-jin, the show is popular because the concept of having to choose a winner is culturally easy to understand. He also named the good relationship between the regular members as one of the reasons for the show's success. Celebrity guests like Super Junior, Girls' Generation, and 2PM play an important part in the success as well, although they sometimes induce criticism. For example, after the airing of the BigBang episodes, some viewers complained that the band won too easily. However, Jo denied any special treatment of the celebrities. Jo explained that fans are also highly critical of the games, therefore it is not possible for the crew to reuse games without changing them.

The regular members of Running Man have held several fan meetings throughout Asia. In October 2013, their Singapore fan meeting drew a crowd of 3,000. When the cast arrived for shooting in Vietnam and other countries, they were greeted by thousands of fans at the airport.

As of 2019, Running Man recorded a peak viewership rating of 8.5%, taking first place among variety shows in the same time slot.

== Discography ==
In conjunction with the 9th year of show, the show held their first ever fan meeting in South Korea. During the fan meeting, they collaborated with different singers. On September 22, 2019, the extended play titled Running Man Fan Meeting: Project Running 9 was released.

Running Man Fan Meeting: Project Running 9

EP by Various artists
- Released: September 22, 2019
- Genre: K-pop
- Length: 21:00
- Language: Korean
- Labels: Kakao; SBS Contents Hub

Tracking list for Running Man Fan Meeting: Project Running 9
No.	Title	Artist	Length
1.	"Hollywood"	Super-X (슈퍼-X) (Yoo Jae-suk and Haha)	3:08
2.	"Party"	Pink Nose Light (핑코빛) (Jee Seok-jin, Lee Kwang-soo, and Apink)	3:06
3.	"Bonjour, Hi" (featuring Yoon Mi-rae; 봉주르 하이)	Hyo Chan Park (효찬공원) (Song Ji-hyo, Yang Se-chan, Code Kunst, and Nucksal)	3:15
4.	"Confession of Your Love" (이제 나와라 고백)	Jeon Soran and Yoo Jae-suk (전소란과 유재석) (Yoo Jae-suk, Jeon So-min, and Soran)	4:03
5.	"Raise your voice"	F-Killer (Haha, Kim Jong-kook, and Gummy)	3:25
6.	"I Like It" (좋아)	Running Man (런닝맨) (Yoo Jae-suk, Haha, Jee Seok-jin, Kim Jong-kook, Lee Kwang-soo, Song Ji-hyo, Jeon So-min, and Yang Se-chan)	4:03
Total length:			21:00

== Ratings ==
- 2010
- 2011
- 2012
- 2013
- 2014
- 2015
- 2016
- 2017
- 2018
- 2019
- 2020
- 2021
- 2022
- 2023
- 2024
- 2025

== Other works ==
=== Merchandising ===
The Running Man 300th Anniversary Special hats and socks on display

In order to "relay the feeling of Running Man", Running Man has made merchandises available on sale since 2015. The products ranging from stickers, socks, hats, shirts, and shoes.

On May 26, 2015, a special project called the "Running Man Challenge" was made in collaboration with a footwear co-created platform, ROOY. Its main objective is for the fans to design a shoe that "would unify and coordinate between the cast members." 777 submissions were made, and in June 2015, a design made by a fan named Noh Seung-soo was selected to be the official design for the shoes. The shoes went on sale on February 22, 2016. Currently, a second "Running Man Challenge" is held. The winner for this challenge will have their design to be the new shoes.

In 2016, Running Man collaborated with NBA to make a 300th Anniversary special hats and shirts.

=== Animation ===
The Soul Tree, the great source of our race. But for its ultimate power and by those whose minds were blinded by it, it also became the catastrophic cause that had brought never-ending wars between the tribes. Tortured by the agonies of the wars, the leaders of the tribes finally came to a peace agreement that they would instead open a competition. Players, equipped with special watches and shields, compete against each other as winner's tribe would be awarded with Materion, the sacred fruit of the Soul Tree. These brave players, who throw themselves in this fierce fight, we call them the Running Man.

— Running Man WORLD VIEW

On June 14, 2017, it was announced that Running Man will be adapted into a half-hour animated show. It features the original seven members, including former member Gary, in animal form. The show will have 24 episodes and EXO-CBX will provide the theme song for it. Additionally, the animated show will be the first to be broadcast in UHD in South Korea. On August 11, 2018, the animated show premiered on Cartoon Network in Southeast Asia as an English dub.

On December 5, 2018, the "Running Man, 2018" animated series was released in theaters. On December 19, 2020, an animated movie, originally serving as a six-episode preview of the new season, premiered on Cartoon Network in Southeast Asia as an English dub with the title "Running Man: The Ultimate Challenge".

=== Comic book ===
In March 2013, a comic book adaptation of the series was published. The series, titled Running Man: How do I Find the Kidnapped Idol?, is written by Hong Yong-hoon and illustrated by Kim Moon-shik. The comic book, which is aimed for children, was released on March 25, 2013.

=== Musical ===
On March 30 and 31, 2019, a play which was titled, "The Musical Running Man" was performed at Busan Citizen's Hall.

=== Other appearances ===
Year	Title	Network	Member(s)	Notes	Ref.
2014	Running Man China	ZRTG	All	Guest	
2015	A Girl Who Sees Smells	SBS	All	Cameo (episode 1)	
2015	Game of Dice	—N/a	Gary, Jee Seok-jin, Kim Jong-kook, Lee Kwang-soo, Song Ji-hyo	Commercial film	
2016	Running Man China	ZRTG	All	Guest	
2021	Running Man Vietnam	HTV	Kim Jong-kook	Guest	
2024	Running Man Philippines	GMA	Haha	Guest	
2026	My Genie Secretary	SBS	All (with Kim Jong-kook also acted as guest on "My Genie Secretary")	Cameo (episode 11)	

=== International versions ===
Running Man had first sold the franchise to China which became Running Man China in 2014. They later sold the franchise to Vietnam and Indonesia in 2019. However, the Indonesian version of Running Man has not been produced.

As of February 22, 2026, there have been aired 20 seasons within 5 versions of Running Man.

Currently airing (1)
An upcoming season (4)
Status unknown (0)
No longer airing (0)

Country/Region	Local title	Network(s)	Season(s) & Winner(s)	Member(s)
China	Running Man China 奔跑吧兄弟; Hurry Up, Brother	Zhejiang Television	Season 1, 2014–2015: Angelababy; Season 2, 2015: Zheng Kai; Season 3, 2015–2016: Chen He; Season 4, 2016: Deng Chao	Current; Li Chen (1–); Zheng Kai (1–); Sha Yi (8–); Bai Lu (YR2–); Fan Chengcheng (11–12, 13–); Yuqi (7, 9–YR2, 11–); Zhang Zhenyuan (NS–); Meng Ziyi (13–); Li Yunrui (13–); Former; Wang Baoqiang (1); Bao Bei'er (2); Dilraba Dilmurat (5); Deng Chao (1–6); Chen He (1–6); Wong Cho-lam (1–6); Lu Han (3–6); Zhu Yawen (7); Wang Yanlin (7); Guo Qilin (8–YR1); Lucas (7, 9); Lin Yi (YR2); Cai Xukun (8–9, 10–LBaBL); Angelababy (1–11); Zhou Shen (10–13)
China	Keep Running 奔跑吧	Zhejiang Television	Season 5, 2017: Deng Chao and Wang Leehom; Season 6, 2018: Angelababy; Season 7, 2019: Zheng Kai; Season 8, 2020: TBA; Yellow River season 1, 2020–2021; Season 9, 2021; Yellow River season 2, 2021; Season 10, 2022; Let's Build a Better Life, 2022; Season 11, 2023; Nature Season, 2023; Season 12, 2024: Zheng Kai and Yuqi; The Ancient Tea-Horse Road, 2024–2025; Season 13, 2025; The Heavenly Road, 2025–2026; Season 14, 2026	Current; Li Chen (1–); Zheng Kai (1–); Sha Yi (8–); Bai Lu (YR2–); Fan Chengcheng (11–12, 13–); Yuqi (7, 9–YR2, 11–); Zhang Zhenyuan (NS–); Meng Ziyi (13–); Li Yunrui (13–); Former; Wang Baoqiang (1); Bao Bei'er (2); Dilraba Dilmurat (5); Deng Chao (1–6); Chen He (1–6); Wong Cho-lam (1–6); Lu Han (3–6); Zhu Yawen (7); Wang Yanlin (7); Guo Qilin (8–YR1); Lucas (7, 9); Lin Yi (YR2); Cai Xukun (8–9, 10–LBaBL); Angelababy (1–11); Zhou Shen (10–13)
Vietnam	Running Man Vietnam	HTV7	Season 1 (Chạy đi chờ chi), 2019: Ninh Dương Lan Ngọc; Season 2 (Chơi là chạy), 2021–2022: Ngô Kiến Huy; Season 3 (Chạy ngay đi), 2025–2026: Anh Tú Atus; Season 4 (Chạy ngay đi), 2026–	Current; Trấn Thành (1, 3–); Ninh Dương Lan Ngọc (1–); Liên Bỉnh Phát (1–); Quang Tuấn (3–); Anh Tú Atus (3–); Quang Trung (3–); Quân A.P (3–); Lê Nhân (3-); Former; BB Trần (1); Trường Giang (2); Jun Phạm (1–2); Trương Thế Vinh (1–2); Thúy Ngân (2); Ngô Kiến Huy (1–2); Karik (2); Jack (2)
Philippines	Running Man Philippines	GMA Network	Season 1, 2022: Angel Guardian; Season 2, 2024: Kokoy de Santos	Current; Mikael Daez (1–); Glaiza de Castro (1–); Lexi Gonzales (1–); Kokoy de Santos (1–); Angel Guardian (1–); Buboy Villar (1–); Miguel Tanfelix (2–); Former; Ruru Madrid (1)
Thailand	Running Man Thailand	One31	Season 1, 2026–	Current; Pramot Pathan (1–); Jeff Satur (1–); Waruntorn Paonil (1–); Tawan Vihokratana (1–); Chawarin Perdpiriyawong (1–); Pittaya Saechua (1–); Pongsathorn Chongwilat (1–)
Indonesia	Running Man Indonesia	TBA		TBA

=== Spin-off ===
Outrun by Running Man is the first official spin-off series of the long running programme, featuring original cast members Kim Jong-kook, Haha, Jee Seok-jin, Song Ji-hyo, and Yang Se-chan. The show premiered on November 12, 2021, and is available for streaming on Disney+ and Hulu.

== Controversy ==
=== Gary's departure ===
In September 2012, Gary made a surprising announcement on social media about his intention to leave the program. It is believed that his intention came from the recent criticism concerning the "Super 7 Concert" which his company, Leessang Company, was producing. Gary decided to take responsibility for its failure by resigning himself from any activities. Due to this, Running Man production staff and the members decided to postpone their filming schedule on September 24–25, 2012 to convince him to stay in the program. A week later, Gary officially apologized for the controversy he created and confirmed his decision to remain as a member of the program. In 2016, Gary again announced his departure from Running Man to focus on his music. However, in 2018 Gary went on Naver TV for an interview and honestly said the reason he wanted to leave the program was that he had nothing left to offer compared to other members or upcoming members (Kim, 2018). This caused Running Man to have a 6-member cast for a few months before casting two new members, Yang Se Chan and Jeon So Min. Gary returned on episode 336 as a surprise guest.

=== Season 2 proposal ===
On December 14, 2016, it was announced that Kim Jong-kook and Song Ji-hyo were leaving the show. Song was to focus on her acting career, while Kim would continue individual activities. The announcement came with a revamp of the program for a second season airing in January 2017, in which Kang Ho-dong was in talks for joining. This would have been the first collaboration between Yoo Jae-suk and Kang Ho-dong since X-Man ended in 2007. However, it was revealed that Kim Jong-kook and Song Ji-hyo were not given any notice about their removal. The following day, Kang Ho-dong's company, SM Culture & Contents, announced that the entertainer had pulled out from the program. SBS released an apology to Kim, Song, and the other Running Man members the same day.

On December 16, 2016, an emergency meeting was held, where consensus was reached to keep the original members and end the program in February 2017. However, on January 24, 2017, SBS announced that the show would continue airing past February. The decision came after Nam Seung-yong, the new Vice President of SBS Entertainment Headquarters, who was involved in conceiving Running Man, had further conversations with every member in regards to the show's future. After Nam apologized to Kim Jong-kook and Song Ji-hyo for all of the issues regarding the program, Kim became actively involved in convincing the other members to continue working on the program.

=== Webtoon plagiarism ===
On April 28, 2019, Running Man was criticized for plagiarizing Naver webtoon Money Game. The aired episode showed cast members put into a studio and given money to spend as a group. The fans of Money Game pointed out the similarities between the episode concept and the webtoon's storyline. Money Game writer Bae Jin-soo and Naver Webtoon, the platform in which the webtoon is published, both stated that they never received prior notification or requests for consent to be able to adopt the webtoon's storyline into a Running Man episode. In response, producers of the show issued an apology to both parties.

=== Depiction of Taiwan ===
During an episode aired on December 7, 2020, the show depicted China and Taiwan as separate countries when playing a board game, which caused outrage and call for boycotts in China.

=== Injury ===
It was revealed that the cast had suffered various injuries such as herniated discs, as a result of the physically challenging games in the show.
