= Soran (band) =

South Korean indie rock band

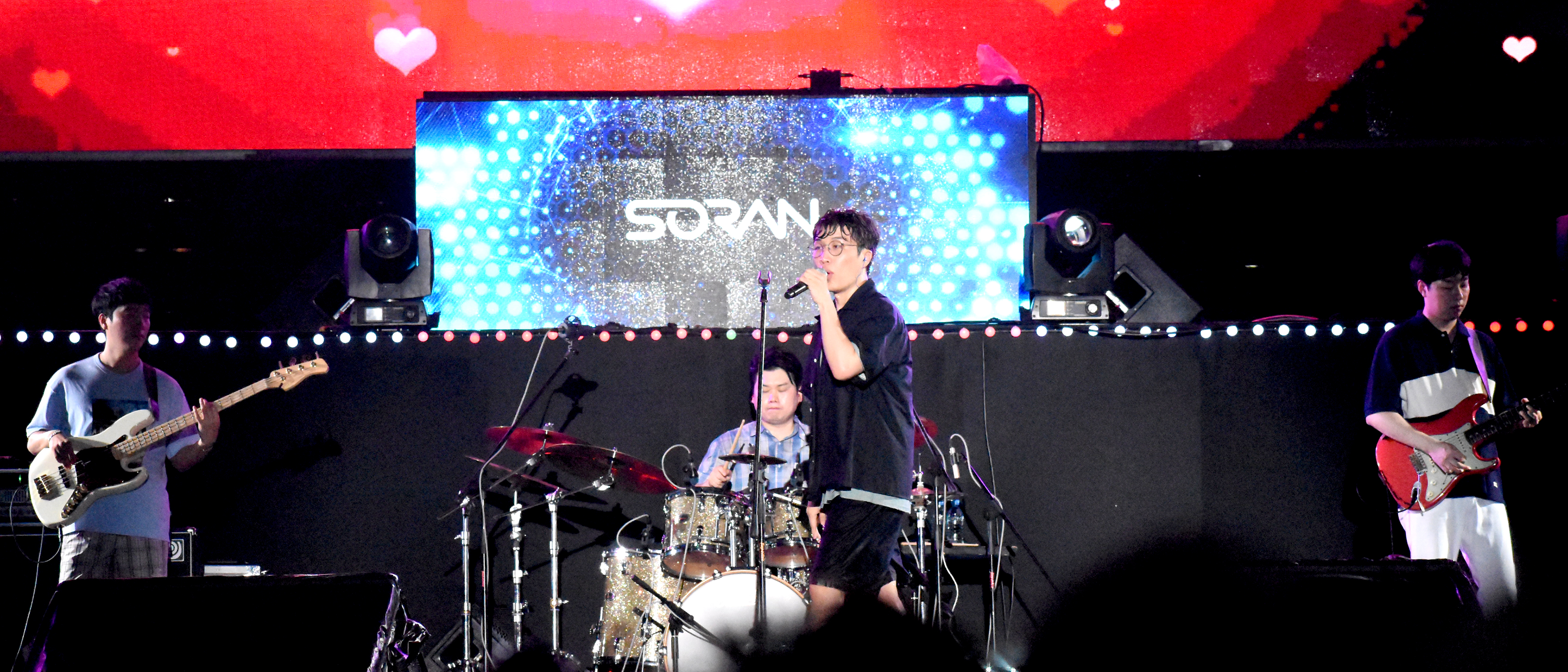
- Soran at the 23rd Busan Sea Festival, August 2018

Background information
- Origin: South Korea
- Genres: Indie rock
- Years active: 2009–present
- Labels: Happy Robot Records
- Members: Ko Young-bae; Lee Tae-uk; Seo Myeon-ho; Pyeon Yu-il
- Website: Official website

Soran (Korean: 소란) is a South Korean indie rock band formed in 2009. They released their first extended play, Why Didn't I Know It Then?, in 2010, followed by the studio albums Natural (2012), Prince (2013), and Cake (2016). They have also released the extended plays Polar (2017) and Share (2018).

The band consists of four members: Ko Young-bae (vocals), Lee Tae-uk (guitar), Seo Myeon-ho (bass), and Pyeon Yu-il (drums).

== Discography ==
=== Studio albums ===
Title	Album details	Peak chart positions	Sales
Title	Album details	KOR	Sales
Natural	Released: April 4, 2012; Label: Happy Robot Records; Formats: LP, CD, cassette	97	—
Prince	Released: October 22, 2013; Label: Happy Robot Records; Formats: CD, cassette	—	—
Cake	Released: October 6, 2016; Label: Happy Robot Records; Formats: CD, cassette	19	KOR: 937

=== Extended plays ===
Title	Album details	Peak chart positions	Sales
Title	Album details	KOR	Sales
Why Didn't I Know It Then? (그때는 왜 몰랐을까)	Released: August 19, 2010; Label: Mirrorball Music; Formats: CD, cassette	—	—
Polar	Released: November 22, 2017; Label: Happy Robot Records; Formats: CD, cassette	46	—
Share	Released: December 6, 2018; Label: Happy Robot Records; Formats: CD, cassette	70	—
Beloved	Released: April 19, 2021; Label: Happy Robot Records; Formats: CD, digital	—	—
Dream	Released: October 17, 2025; Label: MPMG Music; Formats: CD, digital, streaming	97	KOR: 952

=== Singles ===
Title	Year	Peak chart positions		Album
Title	Year	KOR	KOR Down.	Album
"Confession of Love" (가을목이)	2010	—	—	Why Didn't I Know It Then?
"Don't Know" (몰라)	2011	—	—	Wait (single)
"First Date" (준비된 어깨)	2011	—	95	cafe: night & day (various artists compilation)
"Cherry Blossom Falls" (벚꽃이 내린다)	2012	—	68	Natural
"Stuck On You" (미쳤나봐) (with Kwon Jung-yeol of 10cm)	2012	74	65	Natural
"Don't Lose Weight" (살빼지 마요)	2012	—	—	Natural
"Prince"	2013	—	—	Prince
"Ricotta Cheese Salad" (리코타 치즈 샐러드)	2013	—	—	Prince
"Do You Think of Me?" (자꾸 생각나) (with Ggotjam Project and Sam Ock)	2015	—	99	Non-album singles
"I Miss You" (넌 행복해)	2015	—	—	Non-album singles
"Just Before Confession" (고백직전)	2016	—	—	Non-album singles
"Falling in Love" (너를 보네) (feat. Kwon Jung-yeol of 10cm)	2016	—	81	Cake
"Only I Want to Know" (나만 알고 싶다)	2016	—	—	Cake
"I Study You" (너를 공부해)	2017	—	—	Polar
"Perfect Day" (Note: "Perfect Day" (Night Groove Version) is included on Polar.)	2017	—	—	Polar
"(Because We) Fall in Love" (연애 같은 걸 하니까)	2017	—	—	Polar
"Can't Close My Eyes" (잠이 안 와) (Note: "Can't Close My Eyes" is included only on the CD version of Share.)	2018	—	—	Share
"Happy" (행복)	2018	—	—	Share
"What About You" (기적)	2019	—	—	Non-album single
"Be with Me" (있어주면)	2021	—	101	Beloved
"Dang!" (속삭여줘) (feat. Mongja)	2021	—	—	Beloved
"Shutter" (셔터)	2021	—	109	Non-album singles
"Fine" (괜찮아)	2022	—	93	Non-album singles
"Good Bye"	2023	—	158	Setlist
"Voice" (목소리)	2024	—	109	Non-album singles
"Love Crash!" (너의 등장)	2025	—	118	Non-album singles
"Love Is No Sin" (사랑한 마음엔 죄가 없다)	2025	—	137	Dream

=== Soundtrack appearances ===
Title	Year	Album
"Timeline" (타임라인)	2015	Ex-Girlfriends' Club OST
"Mom, I Remember" (엄마, 기억나)	2017	Sing for You OST
"Confession of your Love" (이제 나와라 고백) (with Jeon So-min and Yoo Jae-suk)	2019	Running Man Fan-meeting: Project Running 9
"La La La" (라라라)	2020	Two Yoo Project Sugar Man 3 OST
"Summer" (이 여름)	2022	Love Is for Suckers OST
