= Ji Ye-eun =

South Korean actress (born 1994)

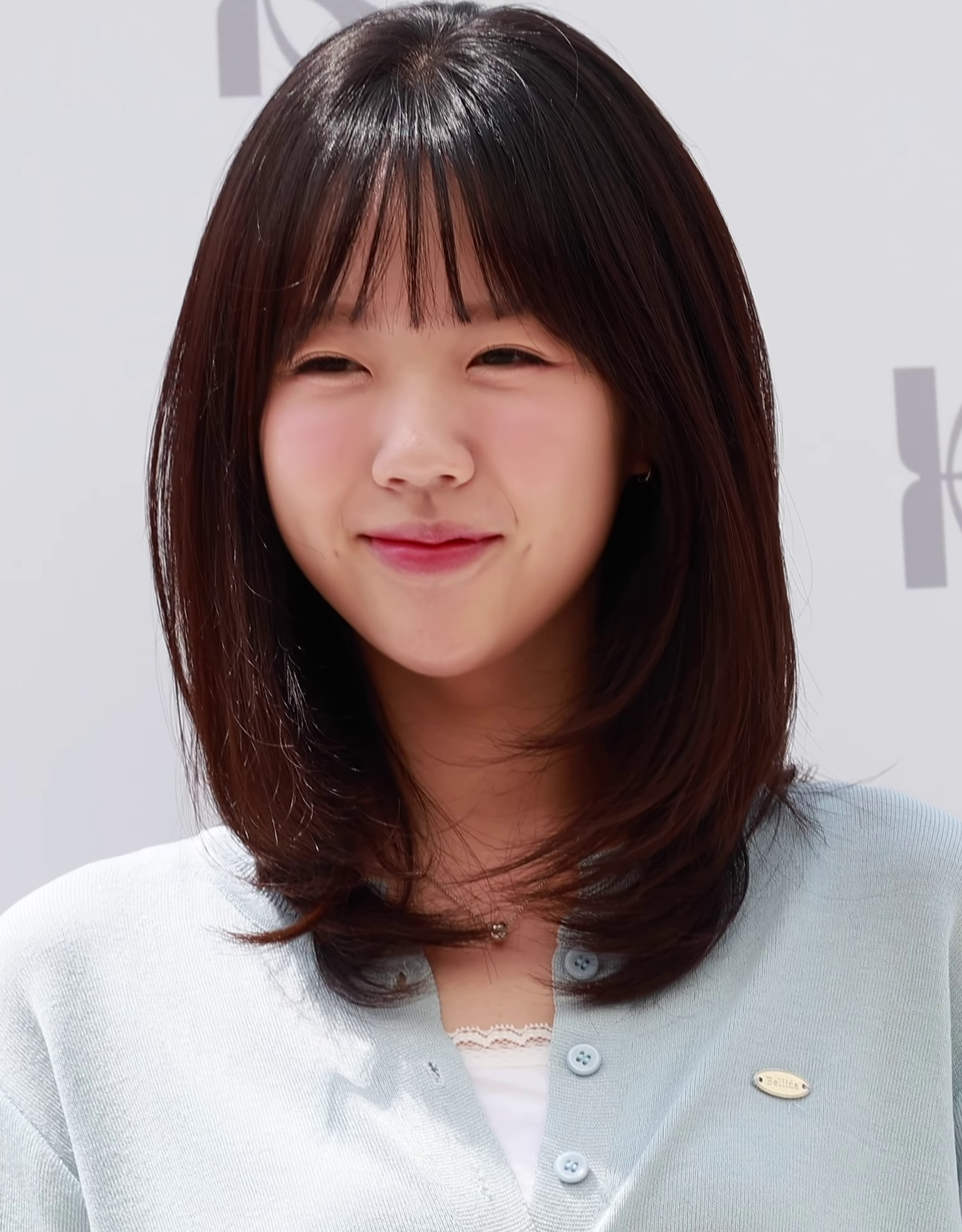
- Ji in 2025
- Born: July 26, 1994 (age 32); Seoul
- Years active: 2017–present
- Agent: CP Entertainment

Korean name
- Hangul: 지예은
- RR: Ji Yeeun
- MR: Chi Yeŭn

Ji Ye-eun (Korean: 지예은; born July 26, 1994) is a South Korean actress and comedian. She gained widespread attention after joining Saturday Night Live Korea in 2022. She is one of the regular cast members of the South Korean variety show Running Man.

== Early life ==
Ji Ye-eun began playing the piano at the age of seven and initially planned to pursue it as her major field of study. During middle school, she became a fan of the girl group Girls' Generation and aspired to become an idol. She attended a dance academy and auditioned for JYP Entertainment and SM Entertainment, but later concluded that this path didn't align with her goals.

After graduating from Jungang Girls' High School, Ji attended an acting academy with a friend and developed a strong interest in acting. She was admitted to the musical theatre department at Hanyang Women's University, but left after one semester because the program emphasised singing more than acting. In 2014, after retaking the university entrance examination, she enrolled at Korea National University of Arts. She later stated that her goal was to become a comedy actress.

== Career ==
=== 2017–2021 : Career beginnings ===
Ji Ye-eun made her acting debut in 2017 in the web drama How To, produced by Piki pictures. She then appeared in the web dramas Yellow (2017) and The taste of Cat (2018). She also appeared in the short films Black Out: Mafia Game (2021), and Okay, Acting Class (2021).

From 2018 to 2019, she was a regular cast member on the variety show The Ultimate Watchlist.

=== 2022–2023: Rising popularity ===
Ji joined SNL Korea Reboot Season 3 (also known as season 12) after successfully auditioning at the recommendation of a producer she had met through The Ultimate Watchlist, which preceded the reboot version of SNL Korea. She gained wider recognition during season 4 for her portrayal of "Chorong's girlfriend".

=== 2024–present: Running Man and mainstream recognition ===
Ji remained a cast member of Saturday Night Live Korea through Season 7 and also served as a host of Midnight Horror Story Season 4 in 2024. She made her first appearance on Running Man on June 2, 2024, receiving favorable reviews from viewers. Beginning with episode 711, which aired on June 30, she became a long-term guest on the program. She was officially announced as a permanent cast member starting with episode 733, broadcast on December 22. As episodes 732 and 733 were filmed during the same recording session, some sources consider her cast membership to have begun with episode 732. At the 2024 SBS Entertainment Awards, Ji and Kang Hoon co-received the Rising Star Award for their appearances on Running Man.

In 2025, Ji starred in Kian's Bizarre B&B, a Netflix original series, alongside Jin of BTS and Kian84. The same year, she received the LG Uplus Positive Influence Award at the 4th Blue Dragon Series Awards. Together with Jee Seok-jin, she formed the co-ed group Chungju Ji-ssi. The duo released the single "Milkshake", featuring Wonstein, on June 21. The duo later performed the song at the Waterbomb festival. On August 26, it was announced that Ji would temporarily suspend activities after being diagnosed with thyroid cancer. She returned to television on episode 776 of Running Man, which aired on November 2. At the 2025 SBS Entertainment Awards, she received the Female Excellence Award.

In 2026, Ji starred in Jae Seok's B&B Rules, which premiered on May 26.

== Personal life ==
Ji is a protestant, which she explained on Song Ji-hyo's Youtube video that she is a member of the church agape choir at the church that she's regularly visited, where she is a soprano. She also can play piano that she learned since she was seven, which she demonstrated it on Knowing Bros, while also said that she won the special prize at the competition that she competed at, but confirmed that she stop playing piano when she was 20 years old. She said that she enjoys spending time at home listening to calm music programs and, when she has a lot on her mind, visiting Kyobo Bookstore or walking along Cheonggyecheon while listening to music. She holds a certification in Chinese Characters.

One of her close friends is actress and comedian Kim Ah-young, who was also a cast member of Saturday Night Live Korea.

On April 13, 2026, her relationship with dancer Vata was publicly confirmed. In September, the couple announced that they will marry on December 12.
