= List of Running Man tours =

The popularity of Running Man throughout Asia has also provided the opportunity for the production team to organize fan meeting tours in Asia since 2013.

== Tours ==
=== 2013: Race Start! Running Man Fan Meeting Asia Tour ===
Date	City	Country	Venue	Attendees
July 13, 2013	Hong Kong	Hong Kong	AsiaWorld–Expo	Gary, Haha, Ji Suk-jin, Kim Jong-kook
September 21, 2013	Beijing	China	Beijing Exhibition Center	Gary, Haha, Ji Suk-jin, Kim Jong-kook
October 5, 2013	Shanghai	China	Shanghai Indoor Stadium	Gary, Haha, Ji Suk-jin, Kim Jong-kook
October 19, 2013	Singapore		Singapore Expo	Gary, Haha, Ji Suk-jin, Kim Jong-kook, Song Ji-hyo

=== 2014: Race Start! Running Man Fan Meeting Asia Tour Season 2 ===
Date	City	Country	Venue	Attendees
September 27, 2014	Bangkok	Thailand	Queen Sirikit National Convention Center	Haha, Ji Suk-jin, Kim Jong-kook, Lee Kwang-soo, Song Ji-hyo
October 4, 2014	Hong Kong	Hong Kong	AsiaWorld–Expo	Haha, Ji Suk-jin, Kim Jong-kook, Lee Kwang-soo, Song Ji-hyo
October 25, 2014	Jakarta	Indonesia	Istora Senayan	Haha, Ji Suk-jin, Kim Jong-kook, Lee Kwang-soo, Song Ji-hyo
November 1, 2014	Kuala Lumpur	Malaysia	Stadium Negara	Haha, Ji Suk-jin, Kim Jong-kook, Lee Kwang-soo, Song Ji-hyo
November 29, 2014	Singapore		The Star Performing Arts Centre	Haha, Ji Suk-jin, Kim Jong-kook, Lee Kwang-soo, Song Ji-hyo

=== 2015: Race Start! Season 3 – Running Man Special Tour ===
Date	City	Country	Venue	Attendees
July 3, 2015	Hong Kong	Hong Kong	AsiaWorld–Expo	All Members
August 21, 2015	Shanghai	China	Mercedes-Benz Arena	All Members
September 18, 2015	Chongqing	China	Chongqing International Expo Center	Gary, Haha, Ji Suk-jin, Kim Jong-kook, Lee Kwang-soo, Song Ji-hyo
October 23, 2015	Beijing	China	Capital Indoor Stadium	All Members
October 30, 2015	Shenzhen	China	Shenzhen Bay Sports Center	Gary, Haha, Ji Suk-jin, Kim Jong-kook, Lee Kwang-soo, Song Ji-hyo
November 20, 2015	Nanjing	China	Nanjing Olympic Sports Center Gymnasium	Gary, Haha, Ji Suk-jin, Kim Jong-kook, Lee Kwang-soo, Song Ji-hyo
December 11, 2015	Wuhan	China	Wuhan Sports Center Gymnasium	Yoo Jae-suk, Haha, Ji Suk-jin, Kim Jong-kook, Lee Kwang-soo, Song Ji-hyo

=== 2017: Race Start! Season 4 – Running Man Fan Meeting ===
Date	City	Country	Venue	Attendees
February 10, 2017	Taipei	Taiwan	Taipei Nangang Exhibition Center	Haha, Ji Suk-jin, Kim Jong-kook, Lee Kwang-soo, Song Ji-hyo, Gary (Special Guest)
February 18, 2017	Macao	Macao	Cotai Arena, The Venetian Macao	Haha, Ji Suk-jin, Kim Jong-kook, Lee Kwang-soo, Song Ji-hyo
March 11, 2017	Bangkok	Thailand	Thunder Dome, Muang Thong Thani	Haha, Ji Suk-jin, Kim Jong-kook, Lee Kwang-soo, Song Ji-hyo
March 25, 2017	Hong Kong	Hong Kong	AsiaWorld-Expo	Haha, Ji Suk-jin, Kim Jong-kook, Lee Kwang-soo, Song Ji-hyo
April 22, 2017	Seri Kembangan	Malaysia	The Mines International Exhibition And Convention Centre	Haha, Ji Suk-jin, Kim Jong-kook, Lee Kwang-soo, Song Ji-hyo

=== 2018: Running Man Live in Taipei ===
Date	City	Country	Venue	Attendees
October 6, 2018	Taipei	Taiwan	Taipei Nangang Exhibition Center	Yoo Jae-suk, Haha, Ji Suk-jin, Kim Jong-kook, Lee Kwang-soo, Song Ji-hyo, Jeon So-min, Yang Se-chan

=== 2019: Running Man Live ===
Date	City	Country	Venue	Attendees
February 2, 2019	Hong Kong	Hong Kong	AsiaWorld–Expo	All Members
August 17, 2019	Jakarta	Indonesia	Istora Senayan	All Members
August 26, 2019	Seoul	South Korea	Ewha Womans University	All Members
December 1, 2019	Ho Chi Minh City	Vietnam	Sala City	All Members, Skull (Special Guest)

=== 2021: Running Man 2021 Online Fanmeeting ===
Date	City	Country	Venue	Attendees
September 5, 2021	Seoul	South Korea	Online	Haha, Ji Suk-jin, Kim Jong-kook, Yang Se-chan, Song Ji-hyo, Jeon So-min

=== 2023: Running Man: A Decade of Laughter ===
Date	City	Country	Venue	Attendees
April 1, 2023	Pasay	Philippines	Mall of Asia Arena	All Members

=== 2024: Running Man: "RUN 2 U" Tour ===
Date	City	Country	Venue	Attendees
July 6, 2024	Manila	Philippines	Mall of Asia Arena	All Members
August 10, 2024	Jakarta	Indonesia	Indonesia Arena	All Members
February 15, 2025	Kuala Lumpur	Malaysia	The Mines International Exhibition And Convention Centre	All Members
