= Romeo (band) =

South Korean boy band

ROMEO (로미오)
- Origin: South Korea
- Genres: K-pop; dance-pop; ballad; synthpop
- Years active: 2015–2017
- Labels: Pony Canyon Korea; CT; HY
- Past members: Seunghwan; Yunsung; Milo; Minsung; Kyle; Hyunkyung; Kangmin
- Website: Official website (Korea); Official website (Japan)

Romeo (Korean: 로미오; Japanese: ロメオ), mostly stylized as ROMEO, is a South Korean boy band formed by Pony Canyon Korea and CT Entertainment in 2015. The group is composed of seven members: Seunghwan, Yunsung, Milo, Minsung, Kyle, Hyunkyung and Kangmin. They debuted with the release of their first mini-album The Romeo on May 7, 2015.

== History ==
=== 2015: Debut with The Romeo and comeback with Zero In ===
At the end of April 2015, it was announced that Japanese company Pony Canyon made a partnership with South Korean agency CT Entertainment to debut a boygroup named Romeo, planning their debut in May. A representative from CT Entertainment told the media, "There have been cases where Japanese music labels will sign on popular Korean acts, but it's unlikely for a Japanese music label to want to start a Korean group. This project is happening thanks to the great trust between Pony Canyon and CT Entertainment." Following this announcement, their agency released a batch of teasers featuring the members, starting with Hyunkyung and ending with Yunsung and Minsung, and finally a full group teaser on April 27. Their agency released another teaser on April 30, this time featuring member Yunsung covering Michael Jackson's Man in the Mirror before releasing the group's first teaser for their debut song "Lovesick" on May 2. The full music video for "Lovesick" was released on May 7, alongside their debut EP The Romeo. The group made its debut on stage on M! Countdown the same day.

On October 28, it was announced that Romeo was going to make a comeback on November 5 with their second mini-album Zero In. On October 30, the group released their first teaser for title song "Target" followed on November 1 by a second teaser. On November 3, they released a medley of the songs from Zero In and on November 4 they released the full music video for "Target".

=== 2016: Romeo Project, Miro and First Love ===
On May 17, CT Entertainment revealed that Romeo was going to release a summer digital single named "Nightmare" on May 23. The group released teasers featuring the seven members before releasing a video teaser on May 20. The full music video for "Nightmare" was released on May 23 alongside the eponym digital single.

On June 17, the group debuted the broadcasting of their first reality TV show named "Romeo Project in Taiwan" on MBC Music.

On June 19, Romeo was announced to release a new EP on June 23, thus releasing teasers featuring different units. The group then released two teasers, with an "Alice in Wonderland" concept, featuring SHINee's Minho, for their new song "Miro" from the eponym EP. It was revealed that Minho took part in filming the group's comeback MV thanks to CT Entertainment's CEO who used to be SHINee's former manager. The full music video for "Miro" was released on June 23 along with the eponym EP, which was released in three different unit versions. A full group version of their new EP was released on July 5. The group revealed that their choreography for "Miro" was inspired from the film The Maze Runner.

On August 17, CT Entertainment announced that Romeo was going to release a special edition of "Miro" as "First Love" on August 22, featuring the title track "Treasure". Furthermore, they also released some teasers with the members.

=== 2017: MIX NINE ===
On October 29, they Milo, Yunsung, Kyle, and Hyunkyung joined South Korean survival program MIX NINE.

== Past members ==
- Seunghwan (Korean: 승환) — leader
- Yunsung (윤성)
- Milo (마일로)
- Minsung (민성)
- Kyle (카일)
- Hyunkyung (현경)
- Kangmin (강민)

== Discography ==
=== Extended plays ===
| Title | Details | Peak chart positions | Sales |
| Title | Details | KOR | Sales |
|---|---|---|---|
| The Romeo | Released: May 7, 2015; Label: CT Entertainment; Format: CD, digital download; Track listing: 1. Smile; 2. Love Sick (예쁘니까); 3. Daisy (데이지); 4. Insomnia (너의 목소리) | 11 | KOR: 3,858+ |
| Zero In | Released: November 5, 2015; Label: CT Entertainment; Format: CD, digital download; Track listing: 1. Zero In; 2. Target; 3. Present; 4. 너만 보여 (DNA); 5. Dear My Princess | 13 | KOR: 2,368+ |
| Miro | Released: June 23, 2016 (Note: Digital, "Kangmin, Seunghwan, Milo Edition", "Hyunkyung, Minsung Edition" and "Yunsung, Kyle Edition" versions only); Released: July 5, 2016 (Note: "Full Member Edition" version); Label: CT Entertainment; Format: CD, digital download; Track listing (Note: Tracks 6, 7 and 8 are only available in the digital and "Full Member Edition" versions of the album): 1. Intro; 2. Miro; 3. Roller Coaster; 4. Hello; 5. Knock Me Out; 6. Mama (삐딱해봤더니); 7. Back 2 You; 8. Nightmare (악몽) [Inst.] | 6 (Note: Full Member Ed peaked at #6; Kangmin-Seunghwan-Milo Ed peaked at #12; Hyunkyung-Minsung Ed peaked at #13; Yunsung-Kyle Ed peaked at #14) | KOR: 8,784+ |
| Miro | Re-released: August 22, 2016 (First Love); Label: CT Entertainment; Format: CD, digital download; Track listing: 1. Treasure; 2. Nightmare (악몽); 3. Miro; 4. Roller Coaster; 5. Hello; 6. Knock Me Out; 7. Mama (삐딱해봤더니); 8. Back 2 You | 17 | KOR: 1,601+ |
| Without U | Released: March 8, 2017; Label: CT Entertainment; Format: CD, digital download; Track listing: 1. Romeo Is Back (Intro); 2. Without U (니가 없는데); 3. Like I Do; 4. Hustle (좋은 차, 좋은 집); 5. Focus On Me (장난치지 마); 6. Blue | 6 | KOR: 9,189+ |
| Without U | Re-released: May 8, 2017 (One Fine Day); Label: CT Entertainment; Format: CD, digital download; Track listing: 1. Stay with Me (성공하면); 2. Without U (니가 없는데); 3. Like I Do; 4. Hustle (좋은 차, 좋은 집); 5. Focus On Me (장난치지 마); 6. Blue | 35 | KOR: 1,336+ |

=== Singles ===
| Title | Year | Peak chart positions | | | Sales | Album |
| Title | Year | KOR Gaon | JPN Oricon | JPN Hot | Sales | Album |
Korean
| "Lovesick" (예쁘니까) | 2015 | — | — | — | —N/a | The Romeo |
| "Target" | 2015 | — | — | — | —N/a | Zero In |
| "Nightmare" (악몽) | 2016 | — | — | — | —N/a | First Love |
| "Miro" | 2016 | — | — | — | —N/a | First Love |
| "Treasure" | 2016 | — | — | — | —N/a | First Love |
| "Without U" (니가 없는데) | 2017 | — | — | — | —N/a | One Fine Day |
| "Stay With Me" (성공하면) | 2017 | — | — | — | —N/a | One Fine Day |
Japanese
| "Without U" | 2017 | — | 7 | 30 | JPN: 15,722+ | Non-album single |
| "Hanabi (花火)" | 2018 | — | 28 | — | JPN: 3,180 | Non-album single |
"—" denotes items that did not chart or were not released.

== Filmography ==
=== Reality/Variety shows ===
| Year | Title | TV Network | Note(s) |
|---|---|---|---|
| 2015–present | Idol x Idol | Naver V App | |
| 2016 | Romeo Project in Taiwan | MBC Music | |

== Videography ==
=== Music videos ===
List of music videos, showing year released and director
| Title | Year | Director(s) | Ref. |
|---|---|---|---|
| "Lovesick" | 2015 | Jo Soohyun @ Picture Nuts | |
| "Target" | 2015 | Lee Sagang @ Zanybros | |
| "Target (Dance ver.)" | 2015 | Lee Sagang @ Zanybros | |
| "Nightmare" | 2016 | —N/a | |
| "Miro" | 2016 | Lee Sagang @ Zanybros | |
| "Miro (Dance ver.)" | 2016 | Lee Sagang @ Zanybros | |
| "Treasure" | 2016 | —N/a | |
| "Without U" (니가 없는데) | 2017 | —N/a | |
| "Stay With Me" | 2017 | —N/a | |

== Awards and nominations ==
=== Gaon Chart K-Pop Awards ===
| Year | Nominee / work | Award | Result |
|---|---|---|---|
| 2016 | Romeo | New Artist of the Year | Nominated |

=== Seoul Music Awards ===
| Year | Nominee / work | Award | Result |
|---|---|---|---|
| 2016 | Romeo | Bonsang Award | Nominated |
| 2016 | Romeo | New Artist Award | Nominated |
| 2016 | Romeo | Popularity Award | Nominated |
| 2016 | Romeo | Hallyu Special Award | Nominated |

=== Korean Entertainment Art Awards ===
| Year | Nominee / work | Award | Result |
|---|---|---|---|
| 2016 | Romeo | Rookie of the Year | Won |
