= 24K+ =

South Korean boy band

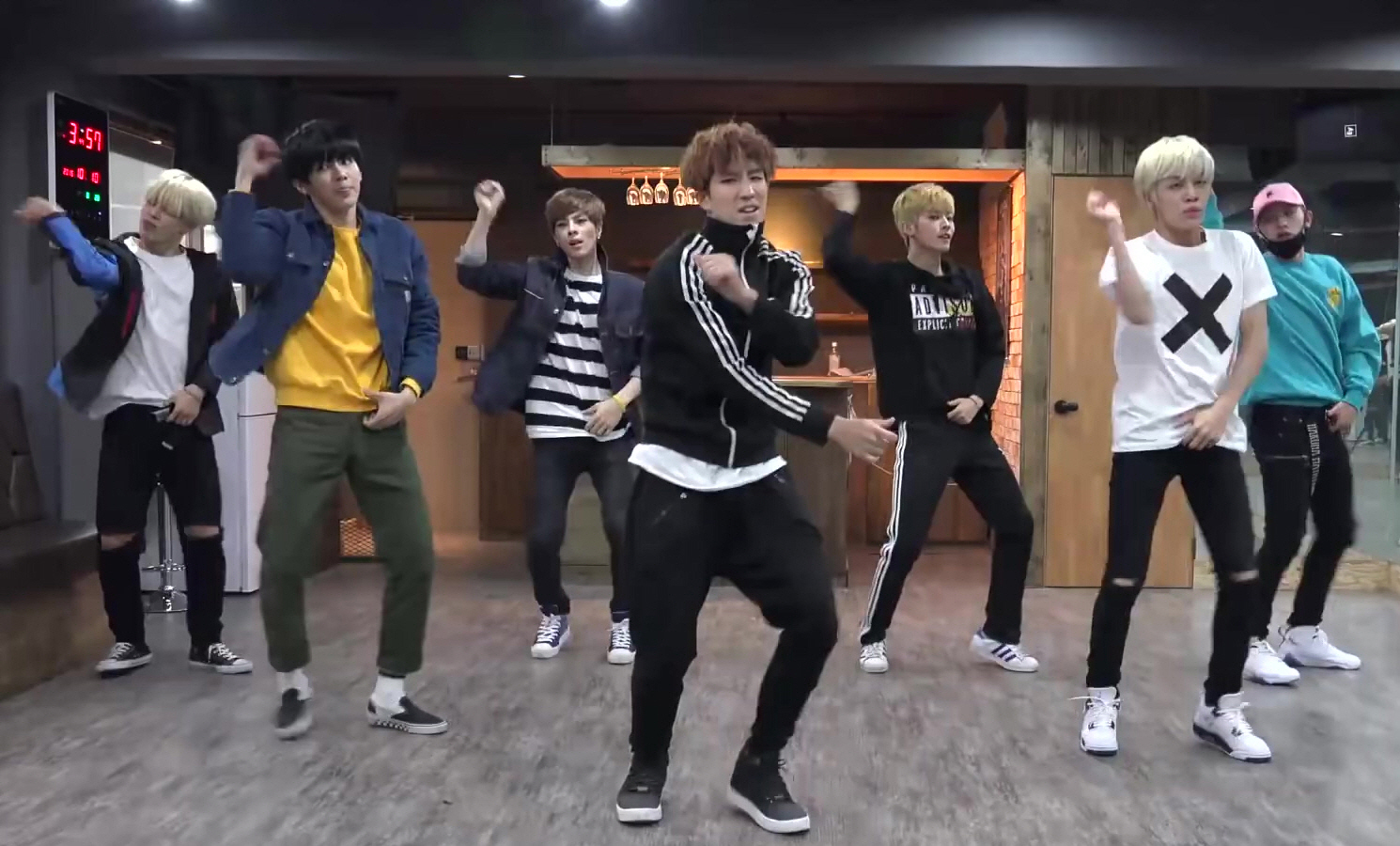
- 24K+ c. 2022. From left to right: Kiyong, Yuma, Xiwoo, Imchan, Takeru

Background information
- Origin: Seoul, South Korea
- Genres: K-pop; dance; hip hop
- Years active: 2012–present
- Label: Choeun Entertainment
- Spinoffs: 4K
- Members: Kiyong; Imchan; Yuma; Takeru
- Past members: Seokjun; Byungho; Daeil; Hui; Cory; Sungoh; Kisu; Jeonguk; Jinhong; Hongseob; Dojun; Youmin; Youngwoong; Changsun; Xiwoo
- Website: cafe.daum.net/official24K

24K+ (Korean: 투포케이+ (Note: Also written as Korean: 투포케이플러스); RR: tupokei peulleoseu, stylized in all caps) is a South Korean boy band formed by Choeun Entertainment. It currently consists of four members: Kiyong, Imchan, Yuma and Takeru. The group's original debut took place on September 6, 2012, with their debut mini album Hurry Up, under the group name, 24K. After several lineup changes, the group rebranded as 24K+ on November 4, 2023.

== History ==
=== 2012–2013: 4K, Hurry Up, and U R So Cute ===
Prior to the debut of the group, the acoustic pop sub-unit 4K debuted. Consisting of vocalists Cory, Seokjune, Kisu, and Sungoh, they released Rocking Girl in June 2012. With the addition of Daeil and Byungho, 24K released their first mini album Hurry Up and the title song on September 6. On January 16 of the following year, 24K began an additional promotion cycle for the record by performing "Secret Love."

24K released their second mini album U R So Cute on August 1, 2013. A "cute" concept, the title track features a "hard rock guitar sound" mixed with a "European-style house beat."

=== 2014–2015: Lineup changes, "Hey You" and "Super Fly" ===
Member Dae-il participated in Mnet's TV show, Dancing 9 Season 2.

24K returned after a 2-year hiatus with the digital single, "Hey You," along with two new members, Hui and Jinhong.

On October 1, 2015, 24K made a comeback with their third mini album Super Fly and the title track of the same name.

=== 2016–2017: Further lineup changes, "Still 24K", The Real One and Addiction ===
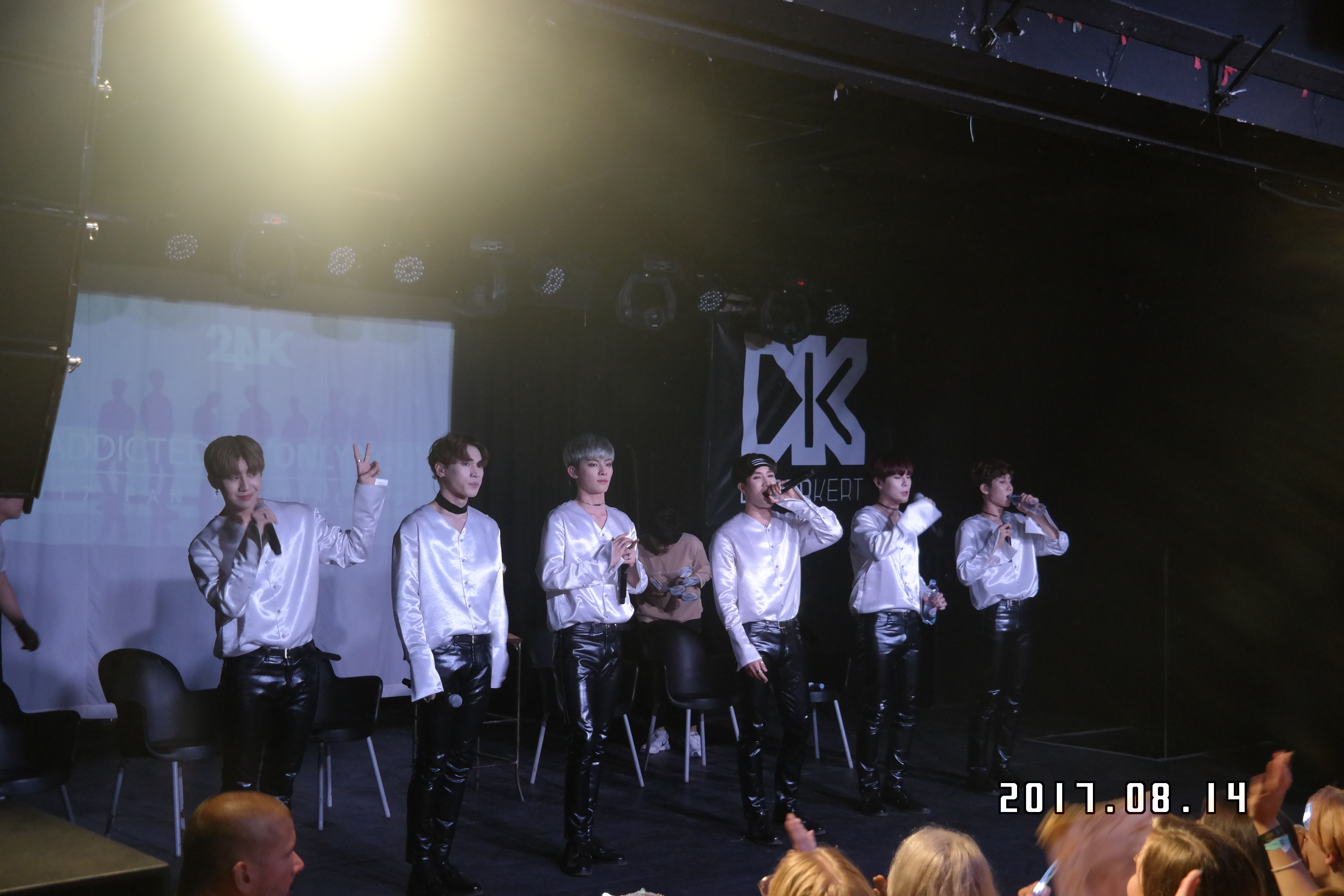
24K in Budapest, Hungary in August 2017

24K had their first European concert in Warsaw, Poland on January 23, 2016, at Progresja Music Zone Main Stage, without Sung-oh. They held a showcase in Malaysia from April 22 to 24 which was presented by New Pro Star, with Sungoh and Daeil being absent for unknown reasons. On August 1, Choeun Entertainment made an official statement saying that members Daeil and Sungoh would be on hiatus; Sungoh was receiving medical treatment for his dislocated shoulder and Daeil had chosen to take a personal leave, although it was later discovered that Daeil had left the group to debut as a solo artist under the name "Big One". The statement also revealed that two new members, Changsun and Hongseob, would be added to continue as a seven-member group. 24K released the digital single "Still 24K" on August 11.

On October 21, 24K returned with their first full-length album titled The Real One containing previously released singles "Secret Love," "Hey You," "Super Fly," "Still 24K" and the title track "Bingo."

24K kicked off their first World tour on December 7, 2016, in 4 Brazilian cities and continued with European tour on January 3, 2017, in Milan, Italy and continued to tour to Helsinki FI, London UK, Warsaw PL, Lisbon PT, Cologne DE, Bucharest RO and finished on January 15, 2017, in Paris, France. Furthermore, in late March 2017 it was announced that 24K would have an encore tour to visit 4 more highly requested countries. The encore tour started on April 2, 2017, in Moscow, Russia and toured to Stockholm Sweden, Madrid Spain and finished on April 9, 2017, in Amsterdam, Netherlands.

24K released their comeback single and MV "Only You" from their single album Addiction on May 26, 2017.

On November 2, Choeun Entertainment made a statement confirming that as of July 6, 2017, Hui had officially left the group, it was also confirmed that Daeil was no longer a member, and that Sungoh's future with the company is to be discussed after he completes his mandatory military service. The remaining six members participated in the JTBC's Survival show Mix Nine.

=== 2018–2021: Blacklist, Kisu's enlistment and new members ===
On May 9, an interview with Billboard revealed that the group's upcoming EP was set to be released on May 25, with the title track titled Bonnie N Clyde.

Also on May 9, it was revealed that 24K was the only idol group that was put on the blacklist by former president Park Geun-hye. The impeached president put together a blacklist of celebrities to exclude them from receiving any support from the state. The blacklist's existence was made known in October 2016 before the president's impeachment, the full list being uncovered in April. A representative of the blacklist declared that the blacklist consisted of those who expressed any sort of support against governmental commands about the Sewol accident and artists who supported presidential candidates Park Won-soon and Moon Jae-in. The blacklist includes their former manager and members Seokjune, Byungho, Cory, Kisu, and Daeil.

On May 11, the company announced that member Kisu would be enlisting in the military to carry out his military service while the group makes another change to the lineup and add a new member named Kiyong. On May 25, 24K released their fourth EP Bonnie N Clyde.

On January 25, 2019, the company announced that member and leader Cory would be leaving 24K since his exclusive contract with the company has expired and will pursue his career as a producer with his new stage name "Corbyn". Cory has also released his solo song and music video "Million Dollar Dream", aka. "M$D" on February 27, 2019, on his official 28Laboratory YouTube channel. It was also stated that Sungoh would not continue as a member of the group and instead will work under Choeun Entertainment as music producer for 24K.

On June 26, 2019, the company announced that Jinhong was not renewing his contract, Hongseob would not be able to continue for health reasons, and Jeonguk has chosen to concentrate on his solo work. Additionally, Kisu announced on his Twitter that he would not return with the group either. The company shared that they will add new members and described it as 24K season 2 coming soon.

On April 2, 2020, the company announced that the new member named Dojun joined the group. On May 26, 2020, the four remaining members of 24K had announced that the hidden member, #5 and Dojun had left citing personal differences. Member #5's name and face were revealed after he left and became an A+ Entertainment trainee and the leader of their upcoming boy group A+ Boys.

On December 23, 2020, photos of a new member, Youngwoong, were published to 24K's media platforms and the company continued to release covers, vlogs, and dance practices without any news of original music releasing. On June 12, 2021, 24K released the digital single "Welcome to the Mainstreet", which would be Changsun's last release with the group before his participation in survival show, 'Extreme Debut: Wild Idol', to which he won a spot in newly-formed group, TAN.

=== 2022-present: New members, concert in Japan, and rebrand to 24K+ ===
On April 28, 2022, it was announced that member Youngwoong would be leaving the group, and that 24K and Choeun would be working hard on finding new members, who would be revealed in the future. On July 22 and 23, 2022, respectively, Yuma and Takeru were announced as new members of 24K, before announcing a fanmeet in Japan with the five active members a few weeks later in August.

On February 15, 2023, the group participated in survival show, Peak Time, as Team 21:00, without Changsun, but were eliminated and revealed in the seventh episode. The group were able to perform and showcase a new original song, "Step by Step", on the final episode of the show.

On September 25, 2023, Changsun officially left the group and Choeun Entertainment in a handwritten letter posted on his Instagram account to focus on his activities in TAN.

On November 4, 2023, the group officially rebranded into 24K+ and released their new logo on their social media platforms. On November 9, 2023, the group their 1st mini album under 24K+, Roller Coaster, will release on November 21. The title track, under the same name, was previously showcased at fanmeets. The song also holds songwriting credits for members Imchan and Xiwoo, as well as two new tracks, "Shooting Star" and "Seraphic". The group was also announced to do a new version of "Honestly", written by former members Jeonguk and Cory.

== Musical style and influences ==
Upon debut, 24K employed various genres into its music. On the EP Hurry Up, the record incorporated pop, trance, dubstep, and industrial into its sound. On the second EP U R So Cute, the group incorporated elements of hip hop and electronic dance music into its sound.

Cory has expressed his admiration for hip hop producers Dr. Dre and Teddy Park. Kisu was influenced by Urban Zakapa, which led to his fascination with R&B and soul music.

== Members ==
=== Current ===
- Kiyong (기용)
- Imchan (임찬)
- Yuma (Korean: 유마)
- Takeru (Korean: 타케루)

=== Former ===
- Byungho (병호)
- Seokjun (석준)
- Sungoh (성오)
- Daeil (대일)
- Hui (휘)
- Cory (코리)
- Kisu (기수)
- Jeonguk (정욱)
- Jinhong (진홍)
- Hongseob (홍섭)
- Dojun (도준)
- Youmin (유민)
- Youngwoong (영웅)
- Changsun (창선)
- Xiwoo (시우)

== Discography ==
=== Studio albums ===
Title	Album details	Peak chart positions	Sales
Title	Album details	KOR	Sales
The Real One	Released: October 22, 2016; Label: Choeun Entertainment, LOEN Entertainment; Format: CD, digital download; Track listing: 1. Bingo; 2. Secret (비밀인데); 3. But I Love You; 4. Still 24K; 5. Super Fly (날라리); 6. Run (달려가); 7. Oasis; 8. Our Block (천국이야); 9. Hey You (오늘 예쁘네); 10. Secret Love; 11. Bingo (Inst.); 12. But I Love You (Inst.)	23	KOR: 2,508+

=== Extended plays ===
Title	Album details	Peak chart positions	Sales
Title	Album details	KOR	Sales
Rocking Girl (as 4K)	Released: June 12, 2012; Label: Choeun Entertainment, CJ E&M; Format: CD, digital download; Track listing: 1. Rocking Girl; 2. Bye Bye Bye; 3. Moonlight Sonata (달빛연가); 4. Rocking Girl (Inst.)	44	—N/a
Hurry Up	Released: September 6, 2012; Label: Choeun Entertainment, LOEN Entertainment; Format: CD, digital download; Track listing: 1. It's Time, 24K; 2. Hurry Up (빨리와); 3. Secret Love; 4. WoA; 5. Hurry Up (Radio Edit); 6. Hurry Up (Inst.)	18	KOR: 1,541+
U R So Cute	Released: August 1, 2013; Label: Choeun Entertainment, LOEN Entertainment; Format: CD, digital download; Track listing: 1. U R So Cute (귀여워 죽엤어); 2. So, How Much? (얼마면 돼); 3. Never (없다); 4. U R So Cute (Radio Edit); 5. U R So Cute (Inst.); 6. So, How Much? (Inst.); 7. Never (Inst.)	20	KOR: 1,042+
Super Fly	Released: October 1, 2015; Label: Choeun Entertainment, LOEN Entertainment; Format: CD, digital download; Track listing: 1. It's Heaven (천국이야); 2. Super Fly (날라리); 3. Run (달려가); 4. Oasis; 5. Hey You (오늘 예쁘네); 6. Super Fly (Inst.); 7. Hey You (Inst.)	22	KOR: 1,874+
Addiction	Released: May 27, 2017; Label: Choeun Entertainment, LOEN Entertainment; Format: CD, digital download; Track listing: 1. Only You (너 하나면 돼); 2. Been You; 3. Only You (너 하나면 돼) (Inst.); 4. Been You (Inst.)	12	KOR: 2,137+
Bonnie N Clyde	Released: May 25, 2018; Label: Choeun Entertainment, LOEN Entertainment; Format: CD, digital download; Track listing: 1. Intro (Luv It); 2. Bonnie N Clyde; 3. Blue; 4. Overflow; 5. To. For You (Kisu solo); 6. Bonnie N Clyde (Inst.)	37	KOR: 981+
Roller Coaster (as 24K+)	Released: November 21, 2023; Label: Choeun Entertainment, LOEN Entertainment; Format: CD, digital download	64	KOR: 1,093+

=== Singles ===
Title	Year	Peak chart positions	Sales	Album
Title	Year	KOR	Sales	Album
Title	Year	Digital	Sales	Album
24K
"Rocking Girl" (as 4K)	2012	—		Rocking Girl
"Hurry Up" (빨리와)	2012	—		Hurry Up
"Secret Love"	2013	—		Hurry Up
"U R So Cute" (귀여워 죽겠어)	2013	112	KOR: 23,938+ (Dig.)	U R So Cute
"Hey You" (오늘 예쁘네)	2015	—		Super Fly
"Super Fly" (날라리)	2015	—		Super Fly
"Still 24K"	2016	—		The Real One
"Bingo"	2016	—		The Real One
"Only You" (너 하나면 돼)	2017	—		Addiction
"Bonnie N Clyde"	2018	—		Bonnie N Clyde
"Welcome to the Mainstreet"	2021	—		Non-album single
24K+
"Roller Coaster"	2023	—	KOR: 1,093 (Phy.)	Roller Coaster
"Summer Time"	2024	—		Non-album singles
4K (sub-unit)
"Rocking Girl"	2012	—		Rocking Girl
"Bye Bye Bye"	2012	—		Rocking Girl
"Moonlight Sonata"	2012	—		Rocking Girl
"—" denotes releases that did not chart or were not released in that region.

== Videography ==
=== Music videos ===
Year	Song	Director
24K
2012	Hurry Up	Unknown
2013	Secret Love	Unknown
2013	U R So Cute	Unknown
2015	Hey You	Unknown
2015	Super Fly	Unknown
2016	Still 24K	Zanybros
2016	Bingo	Zanybros
2017	Only You	Zanybros
2018	Bonnie N Clyde	Unknown
2021	Welcome To Mainstreet	Unknown
24K+
2023	Roller Coaster	Unknown
2024	Summer Time	Unknown
4K
2012	Rocking Girl	Unknown
2012	Bye Bye Bye	Unknown
2012	Moonlight Sonata	Unknown

== Concerts and tours ==
=== World tours ===
- 2017/2018: First World Tour "Still With 24U"

=== Encore tours ===
- 2017–2018: First Encore Tour "Still With 24U, The Encore"

=== European concerts ===
- 2016: First European concert in Warsaw, Poland on January 23.

=== Fanmeeting Tours ===
- 2017: "Only You" Europe Fan Meeting Tour.
