= Sobangcha =

Early Korean boy band

SoBangCha
- Origin: Seoul, South Korea
- Genre: Dance pop
- Years active: 1987–1990; 1994–1996; 2005–2012
- Label: Hanbat Planning
- Members: Kim Tae-hyung; Jung Won-kwan
- Past members: Lee Sang-won; Go Dun-woo

Sobangcha (Korean: 소방차) is a South Korean three-member dance pop music group formed by Hanbat Planning. The group is composed of Kim Tae-hyung, Jeong Won-gwan, and Lee Sang-won. Former member Dun-woo left the group in 1990. Sobangcha was one of the earliest Kpop groups and served as a prototype for later groups which were influenced by its style.

The group debuted in 1987 with "Tell Her". In 1988, after recording the title song of the 2nd album, 《On the Phone》, Lee Sang-won worked for two weeks and then withdrew. They disbanded in 1990 after the best album. After regrouping as original members in 1994, G Cafe was announced. They completely disbanded in 1996 after the fifth album. They re-formed in 2005 with two members. In 2012, Jeong Won-gwan was re-recruited. That same year Lee Sangwon announced he would not continue as a member of Sobangcha.

== Discography ==
- Fire Truck Vol. 1 (1987)
- Fire Truck Vol. 2 (1988)
- Fire Truck Vol. 3 (1989)
- KBS cartoon movie 'Wonder Kiddy in the Universe in 2020 (1989)
- Best (1989)
- Again (1995)
- Fire Truck Vol. 5 Sobangcha 96 Forever (1996)
- 05 Man's Life (2005)

== Controversy ==
Sobangcha was also criticized for copying the Japanese group, Shonentai. In particular, "On the Phone Call", which was included in the second album in 1988 and received great popularity, was made by almost borrowing the composition and progression of the song from "Diamond Eyes" released by Boys' Generation in 1986, and even the costumes and dance were taken as it is.
