= List of Running Man episodes (2018) =

- No. of episodes: 49

Release
- Original network: SBS
- Original release: January 7 – December 30, 2018

Season chronology
- ← Previous; 2017 Next → 2019

This is a list of episodes of the South Korean variety show Running Man in 2018. The show airs on SBS as part of their Good Sunday lineup.

== Episodes ==
List of episodes (384–432)
Ep.	Airdate (Filming date)	Guest(s)	Landmark	Teams		Mission	Results
384 (Note: New Year's Special.) (Note: Special appearance by fortune teller Park Sung-joon.)	January 7, 2018 (December 19, 2017)	No guests	Asia Culture Center (Munhwajeondang-ro, Dong District, Gwangju)	Mission Team (Kim Jong-kook, Jeon So-min, Lee Kwang-soo, Haha, Song Ji-hyo, Yang Se-chan)	Hands of Stone (Yoo Jae-suk, Ji Suk-jin)	Have a gold pouch or identify the "hands of stone" to avoid the penalty	Yoo Jae-suk, Ji Suk-jin, Kim Jong-kook, Lee Kwang-soo, Song Ji-hyo, Yang Se-chan Wins Haha and Jeon So-min got water-bombed penalty with Kim Jong-kook and Lee Kwang-soo who were also water-bombed to fulfil previous penalty [see ep 383].
385 (Note: Special appearance by Jang Hyuk, Kim Young-chul, Lee Sang-yeob, Park Geun-sik and Park Na-rae. Brief appearance by Yoon Kye-sang through the phone.)	January 14, 2018 (January 2, 2018)	No guests	SBS Prism Tower (Sangam-dong, Mapo District, Seoul)	Yoo Jae-suk & Jeon So-min Haha & Lee Kwang-soo Ji Suk-jin & Kim Jong-kook Song Ji-hyo & Yang Se-chan		Have the most "R" ddakji by the end of the race	Yoo Jae-suk Wins The members filmed Yoo Jae-suk's storyboard for the show's rating notice. (Note: Haha dressed as Toshio Saeki, Ji Suk-jin dressed as a beggar, Kim Jong-kook wore a cat outfit, Lee Kwang-soo wore a giraffe outfit, Song Ji-hyo dressed as No Face, Jeon So-min wore a parrot outfit and Yang Se-chan wore a catfish outfit.)
386	January 14, 2018 (January 2, 2018)	No guests	SBS Prism Tower (Sangam-dong, Mapo District, Seoul)	Yoo Jae-suk & Jeon So-min Haha & Lee Kwang-soo Ji Suk-jin & Kim Jong-kook Song Ji-hyo & Yang Se-chan		Have the most "R" ddakji by the end of the race	Yoo Jae-suk Wins The members filmed Yoo Jae-suk's storyboard for the show's rating notice.
386	January 21, 2018 (January 2 & 8-9, 2018)	No guests	Hongik University Street (Hongdae, Mapo District, Seoul)	No teams		Eat 4 different dishes with only ₩10,000 and within 5 hours to avoid receiving the bad luck badges and avoid the penalty	Yoo Jae-suk, Haha, Ji Suk-jin, Kim Jong-kook, Lee Kwang-soo, Song Ji-hyo, Jeon So-min Wins Yang Se-chan chose Jeon So-min to receive the penalty with him. They wore the dog outfit in public and walked 5000 steps as punishment.
387	January 28, 2018 (January 15, 2018)	No guests	Iksan Prison Filming Site (Seongdang-myeon, Iksan, North Jeolla Province)	No teams		Complete missions or make a tofu to reduce your prison time and avoid becoming the last person to be released	Yoo Jae-suk, Haha, Ji Suk-jin, Kim Jong-kook, Song Ji-hyo, Jeon So-min, Yang Se-chan Wins Lee Kwang-soo stayed and made tofu for his remaining prison time and got water-bombed as punishment.
388	February 4, 2018 (January 23, 2018)	Goo Hara Kang Mi-na (Gugudan) Lee Da-hee Seol In-ah	Brick Campus (Jeju-si, Jeju Province)	Talent Competition: Yoo Jae-suk & Song Ji-hyo Haha & Seol In-ah Ji Suk-jin & Jeon So-min Kim Jong-kook & Goo Ha-ra Lee Kwang-soo & Kang Mi-na Yang Se-chan & Lee Da-hee Roulette for Lunch: Yoo Jae-suk & Song Ji-hyo Haha & Seol In-ah Ji Suk-jin & Jeon So-min Kim Jong-kook & Goo Ha-ra Lee Kwang-soo & Lee Da-hee Yang Se-chan & Kang Mi-na Pirate Roulette Quiz: Yoo Jae-suk & Goo Ha-ra Haha & Seol In-ah Ji Suk-jin & Jeon So-min Kim Jong-kook & Song Ji-hyo Lee Kwang-soo & Lee Da-hee Yang Se-chan & Kang Mi-na		Have the highest or the lowest sum of the assigned numbers	Yoo Jae-suk & Goo Ha-ra, Lee Kwang-soo & Lee Da-hee, Yang Se-chan & Kang Mi-na Wins Kim Jong-kook, Jeon So-min and Seol In-ah got exempted from the penalty. Haha, Ji Suk-jin and Song Ji-hyo got water-bombed.
389	February 18, 2018 (January 22, 2018)	Goo Hara Kang Mi-na (Gugudan) Lee Da-hee Seol In-ah	Brick Campus (Jeju-si, Jeju Province)			Have the highest or the lowest sum of the assigned numbers	Yoo Jae-suk & Goo Ha-ra, Lee Kwang-soo & Lee Da-hee, Yang Se-chan & Kang Mi-na Wins Kim Jong-kook, Jeon So-min and Seol In-ah got exempted from the penalty. Haha, Ji Suk-jin and Song Ji-hyo got water-bombed.
389	February 18, 2018 (January 22, 2018)	No guests	Jeju Shinhwa World (Seogwipo, Jeju Province)	Senior Yoo Team (Yoo Jae-suk, Haha, Kim Jong-kook, Jeon So-min)	Junior Ji Team (Ji Suk-jin, Lee Kwang-soo, Song Ji-hyo, Yang Se-chan)	Be the first team to make a line on the bingo card	Senior Yoo Team Wins Song Ji-hyo was chosen to sleep in a luxury suite with Yoo Jae-suk, Kim Jong-kook and Jeon So-min. Haha was chosen to sleep on top of an ice rink with Ji Suk-jin, Lee Kwang-soo and Yang Se-chan.
390 (Note: Guests who appeared in this episode were cast by the Running Man members.)	March 4, 2018 (February 26, 2018)	Heo Kyung-hwan Lee Sang-yeob Shorry J (Mighty Mouth) Yoo Byung-jae	Yeongjong Bridge Service Area (Jeongseojinnam-ro, Seo District, Incheon)	Okinawa's Yoo-So-Body Team (Yoo Jae-suk, Ji Suk-jin, Jeon So-min, Heo Kyung-hwan) Daema Island's Love Triangle Team (Haha, Lee Kwang-soo, Song Ji-hyo, Lee Sang-yeob) Bangkok's Between Friends Team (Kim Jong-kook, Yang Se-chan, Shorry J, Yoo Byung-jae)		Have the fewest steps to avoid the penalty	Yoo-So-Body Team & Love Triangle Team Wins Shorry J who has the highest number of steps, chose Kim Jong-kook as his partner for indoor fishing in Incheon.
391	March 11, 2018 (February 26–27, 2018)	Heo Kyung-hwan Lee Sang-yeob Shorry J (Mighty Mouth) Yoo Byung-jae	Yeongjong Bridge Service Area (Jeongseojinnam-ro, Seo District, Incheon)	Okinawa's Yoo-So-Body Team (Yoo Jae-suk, Ji Suk-jin, Jeon So-min, Heo Kyung-hwan) Daema Island's Love Triangle Team (Haha, Lee Kwang-soo, Song Ji-hyo, Lee Sang-yeob) Bangkok's Between Friends Team (Kim Jong-kook, Yang Se-chan, Shorry J, Yoo Byung-jae)		Have the fewest steps to avoid the penalty	Yoo-So-Body Team & Love Triangle Team Wins Shorry J who has the highest number of steps, chose Kim Jong-kook as his partner for indoor fishing in Incheon.
392 (Note: Special appearances by Son Na-eun (Apink) and Sheranut "Namcha" Yusanonda.) (Note: Family Package Special.)	March 18, 2018 (February 26–27 & March 12, 2018)	Heo Kyung-hwan Lee Sang-yeob Shorry J (Mighty Mouth) Yoo Byung-jae	Yeongjong Bridge Service Area (Jeongseojinnam-ro, Seo District, Incheon)	Okinawa's Yoo-So-Body Team (Yoo Jae-suk, Ji Suk-jin, Jeon So-min, Heo Kyung-hwan) Daema Island's Love Triangle Team (Haha, Lee Kwang-soo, Song Ji-hyo, Lee Sang-yeob) Bangkok's Between Friends Team (Kim Jong-kook, Yang Se-chan, Shorry J, Yoo Byung-jae)		Have the fewest steps to avoid the penalty	Yoo-So-Body Team & Love Triangle Team Wins Shorry J who has the highest number of steps, chose Kim Jong-kook as his partner for indoor fishing in Incheon.
392	March 18, 2018 (February 26–27 & March 12, 2018)	Hong Jin-young Kang Han-na Lee Da-hee Lee Sang-yeob	The House of Changwon (Uichang District, Changwon, South Gyeongsang Province)	Yoo Jae-suk & Jeon So-min Haha & Song Ji-hyo Ji Suk-jin & Lee Sang-yeob Kim Jong-kook & Hong Jin-young Lee Kwang-soo & Lee Da-hee Yang Se-chan & Kang Han-na		Avoid having the lowest, highest and same number of diamonds at the end of the race (Note: The winning team received a luxury package while the losing team received a shuddering package. At the end, a roulette will be spun to decide which package will be fulfilled by the members.)	Haha & Song Ji-hyo, Yang Se-chan & Kang Han-na Wins Haha, Song Ji-hyo, Yang Se-chan and Kang Han-na received a luxury package. Kim Jong-kook and Hong Jin-young was exempted from receiving a shuddering package. Yoo Jae-suk, Ji Suk-jin, Lee Kwang-soo, Jeon So-min, Lee Da-hee, Lee Sang-yeob received a shuddering package.
393	March 25, 2018 (March 12, 2018)	Hong Jin-young Kang Han-na Lee Da-hee Lee Sang-yeob	The House of Changwon (Uichang District, Changwon, South Gyeongsang Province)	Yoo Jae-suk & Jeon So-min Haha & Song Ji-hyo Ji Suk-jin & Lee Sang-yeob Kim Jong-kook & Hong Jin-young Lee Kwang-soo & Lee Da-hee Yang Se-chan & Kang Han-na		Avoid having the lowest, highest and same number of diamonds at the end of the race	Haha & Song Ji-hyo, Yang Se-chan & Kang Han-na Wins Haha, Song Ji-hyo, Yang Se-chan and Kang Han-na received a luxury package. Kim Jong-kook and Hong Jin-young was exempted from receiving a shuddering package. Yoo Jae-suk, Ji Suk-jin, Lee Kwang-soo, Jeon So-min, Lee Da-hee, Lee Sang-yeob received a shuddering package.
394 (Note: Special appearances by announcer Kim Yoon-sang [ko], skeleton racers Kim Ji-soo and Yun Sung-bin.)	April 1, 2018 (March 19, 2018)	Hong Jin-young Kang Han-na Lee Da-hee Lee Sang-yeob	SBS Tanhyeon-dong Production Center (Ilsanseo District, Goyang, Gyeonggi Province)	Athletes (Yoo Jae-suk, Ji Suk-jin, Kim Jong-kook, Song Ji-hyo, Yang Se-chan, Hong Jin-young, Kang Han-na, Lee Da-hee) Gold Medalist (Lee Kwang-soo)	Coaches (Haha, Jeon So-min, Lee Sang-yeob)	Eliminate the coaches before they eliminate the gold medalist	Athletes & Gold Medalist Wins Lee Da-hee, Yoo Jae-suk, Kim Jong-kook, Ji Suk-jin, Hong Jin-young and Lee Kwang-soo received a luxury package. Song Ji-hyo, Kang Han-na, Jeon So-min, Haha, Yang Se-chan and Lee Sang-yeob received a shuddering package.
395	April 8, 2018 (March 19, 2018)	Hong Jin-young Kang Han-na Lee Da-hee Lee Sang-yeob	SBS Tanhyeon-dong Production Center (Ilsanseo District, Goyang, Gyeonggi Province)	Athletes (Yoo Jae-suk, Ji Suk-jin, Kim Jong-kook, Song Ji-hyo, Yang Se-chan, Hong Jin-young, Kang Han-na, Lee Da-hee) Gold Medalist (Lee Kwang-soo)	Coaches (Haha, Jeon So-min, Lee Sang-yeob)	Eliminate the coaches before they eliminate the gold medalist	Athletes & Gold Medalist Wins Lee Da-hee, Yoo Jae-suk, Kim Jong-kook, Ji Suk-jin, Hong Jin-young and Lee Kwang-soo received a luxury package. Song Ji-hyo, Kang Han-na, Jeon So-min, Haha, Yang Se-chan and Lee Sang-yeob received a shuddering package.
396	April 15, 2018 (March 26, 2018)	Hong Jin-young Kang Han-na Lee Da-hee Lee Sang-yeob	Sea Garden Pension (Hwangcheong-ri, Naega-myeon, Ganghwa County, Incheon)	Pink Team (Yoo Jae-suk, Ji Suk-jin, Kim Jong-kook, Song Ji-hyo, Yang Se-chan, Hong Jin-young) Green Team (Haha, Lee Kwang-soo, Jeon So-min, Kang Han-na, Lee Da-hee, Lee Sang-yeob)		Complete the missions and avoid stealing items that have been listed by the other team	Pink Team Wins Yoo Jae-suk, Ji Suk-jin, Song Ji-hyo, Jeon So-min, Yang Se-chan and Hong Jin-young received a luxury package. Haha, Kim Jong-kook, Lee Kwang-soo, Kang Han-na, Lee Da-hee and Lee Sang-yeob received a shuddering package.
397 (Note: Special appearances by Jo Se-ho, Lee Jong-hyuk, Lee Young-eun and Park Jeong-min. Brief appearance by Jin (BTS) through the phone.) (Note: The race was resumed in the first half of ep 401.)	April 22, 2018 (April 2, 2018)	No guests	Hanwoo Plaza (Cheonggyesan-ro, Sinwon-dong, Seocho District, Seoul)	Yoo Jae-suk & Kim Jong-kook Haha & Jeon So-min Ji Suk-jin & Song Ji-hyo Lee Kwang-soo & Yang Se-chan		Earn the most points at the end of the race	Haha Wins The members will film Haha's storyboard for the show's rating notice [see ep 401].
398 (Note: Special appearances by Chaeyoung, Dahyun, Jeongyeon, Jihyo, Mina, Momo, Nayeon, Sana and Tzuyu (Twice).)	April 29, 2018 (April 16, 2018)	No guests	Milky Way Pension (Cheongpyeong-myeon, Gapyeong County, Gyeonggi Province)	No teams		Follow the schedule to avoid receiving a penalty badge	Haha, Kim Jong-kook, Song Ji-hyo, Jeon So-min, Yang Se-chan Wins Yoo Jae-suk, Ji Suk-jin and Lee Kwang-soo signed 365 autographs as a penalty.
399	May 6, 2018 (April 16 & 9, 2018)	No guests	Milky Way Pension (Cheongpyeong-myeon, Gapyeong County, Gyeonggi Province)	No teams		Follow the schedule to avoid receiving a penalty badge	Haha, Kim Jong-kook, Song Ji-hyo, Jeon So-min, Yang Se-chan Wins Yoo Jae-suk, Ji Suk-jin and Lee Kwang-soo signed 365 autographs as a penalty.
399	May 6, 2018 (April 16 & 9, 2018)	Hong Jin-young Kang Han-na Lee Da-hee Lee Sang-yeob	Incheon International Airport (Gonghang-ro, Jung District, Incheon)	Hong Kong Team (Yoo Jae-suk, Jeon So-min, Yang Se-chan, Kang Han-na) Land Team (Ji Suk-jin, Haha, Song Ji-hyo, Lee Sang-yeob) Island Team (Kim Jong-kook, Lee Kwang-soo, Hong Jin-young, Lee Da-hee)		Avoid earning the Running Balls	Haha, Kim Jong-kook, Song Ji-hyo, Jeon So-min, Kang Han-na, Lee Sang-yeob Wins Haha, Kim Jong-kook, Song Ji-hyo, Yang Se-chan, Hong Jin-young and Kang Han-na was chosen to go to Switzerland for the luxury package tour. Yoo Jae-suk, Ji Suk-jin, Lee Kwang-soo, Jeon So-min, Lee Da-hee and Lee Sang-yeob was chosen to go to the UK for the shuddering package tour. (Note: Haha, Kim Jong-kook, Song Ji-hyo, Jeon So-min, Kang Han-na and Lee Sang-yeob received a luxury package. Yoo Jae-suk, Ji Suk-jin, Lee Kwang-soo, Yang Se-chan, Hong Jin-young and Lee Da-hee received a shuddering package.)
400	May 13, 2018 (April 9, 2018)	Hong Jin-young Kang Han-na Lee Da-hee Lee Sang-yeob	Incheon International Airport (Gonghang-ro, Jung District, Incheon)	Hong Kong Team (Yoo Jae-suk, Jeon So-min, Yang Se-chan, Kang Han-na) Land Team (Ji Suk-jin, Haha, Song Ji-hyo, Lee Sang-yeob) Island Team (Kim Jong-kook, Lee Kwang-soo, Hong Jin-young, Lee Da-hee)		Avoid earning the Running Balls	Haha, Kim Jong-kook, Song Ji-hyo, Jeon So-min, Kang Han-na, Lee Sang-yeob Wins Haha, Kim Jong-kook, Song Ji-hyo, Yang Se-chan, Hong Jin-young and Kang Han-na was chosen to go to Switzerland for the luxury package tour. Yoo Jae-suk, Ji Suk-jin, Lee Kwang-soo, Jeon So-min, Lee Da-hee and Lee Sang-yeob was chosen to go to the UK for the shuddering package tour.
401 (Note: The first half of the episode resumed the race from ep 397.)	May 20, 2018 (April 2 & May 7, 2018)	No guests	Goyang Gymnasium (Ilsanseo District, Goyang, Gyeonggi Province)	No teams		Earn the most points at the end of the race	Haha Wins The members will film Haha's storyboard for the show's rating notice.
401	May 20, 2018 (April 2 & May 7, 2018)	Cheon Sung-moon Han Ki-bum Han Min-gwan Jo Woo-jong Kim Ok-jeong (Haha's mother) K.Will Lee Jong-hyuk Seo Ji-seok	Yongma Land (Mangu-dong, Jungnang District, Seoul)	Yoo Jae-suk & Seo Ji-seok Haha & Kim Ok-jeong Ji Suk-jin & Jo Woo-jong Kim Jong-kook & K.Will Lee Kwang-soo & Han Ki-bum Song Ji-hyo & Cheon Sung-moon Jeon So-min & Han Min-gwan Yang Se-chan & Lee Jong-hyuk		Earn the "R" coins	Haha & Kim Ok-jeong Wins The members and guests filmed Haha's storyboard for the show's rating notice. (Note: Yoo Jae-suk and Seo Ji-seok wore a Barrel Man outfit, Ji Suk-jin and Jo Woo-jong dressed as No Face, Kim Jong-kook and K.Will dressed as Boy Frog, Lee Kwang-soo and Han Ki-bum wore a white spandex with white-painted face, Song Ji-hyo and Cheon Sung-moon dressed as the Joker, Jeon So-min and Han Min-gwan dressed as Toshio Saeki, Yang Se-chan and Lee Jong-hyuk dressed as Annabelle.)
402	May 27, 2018 (May 14, 2018)	Dayoung (Cosmic Girls) Hyejeong Seolhyun (AOA) JooE (Momoland) Kang Seung-yoon Song Min-ho (Winner)	AK Resort (Seorak-myeon, Gapyeong County, Gyeonggi Province)	Vaccinated Human (Song Min-ho) Human Team (Haha, Ji Suk-jin, Kim Jong-kook, Lee Kwang-soo, Song Ji-hyo, Jeon So-min, Yang Se-chan, Dayoung, Seolhyun, JooE, Kang Seung-yoon)	Contagious Zombies (Yoo Jae-suk, Hyejeong)	Identify and eliminate the contagious zombies	Human Team Wins Human Team and Vaccinated Human each received a golden egg ring.
403 (Note: Brief appearances by Byul, Kim Sung-oh and Yang Se-hyung through video recordings.)	June 3, 2018 (May 21, 2018)	No guests	Wootdali Culture Village (Seotan-myeon, Pyeongtaek, Gyeonggi Province)	No teams		Retain the most money or avoid having the lowest number of votes at the end of the race	Kim Jong-kook Wins Jeon So-min was flogged by Kim Jong-kook as penalty.
404 (Note: Brief appearance by Lee Jong-hyuk through the phone.)	June 10, 2018 (May 22, 2018)	No guests	Watery Sky Garden (Tanhyeon-myeon, Paju, Gyeonggi Province)	No teams		Finish 20 meals in 5 hours and avoid having the least meal badges	Everyone Wins Ji Suk-jin was thrown with water balloons by the other members as penalty.
405	June 17, 2018 (May 28, 2018)	Lee Guk-joo Kyungri (Nine Muses) Seo Eun-soo Son Dam-bi	Gongsanseong Fortress (Ungjin-dong, Gongju, South Chungcheong Province)	King (Ji Suk-jin) Civilians (Yoo Jae-suk, Kim Jong-kook, Song Ji-hyo, Lee Guk-joo, Kyungri, Seo Eun-soo)	Boss (Haha) Thieves (Lee Kwang-soo, Jeon So-min, Yang Se-chan, Son Dam-bi)	Find the boss before the thieves find the king	Boss & Thieves Wins Ji Suk-jin, Kim Jong-kook, Song Ji-hyo, Kyungri and Lee Guk-joo got water-showered penalty.
406	June 24, 2018 (June 9–11, 2018)	Hong Jin-young Kang Han-na Lee Da-hee Lee Sang-yeob	Charles Kuonen Suspension Bridge (Randa, Switzerland) Oxford Castle (Oxford, England, UK)	No teams		Luxury Package: Complete the itinerary and avoid paying the additional fees Shuddering Package: Survive the pop-up pirate roulette challenge to avoid the wing walking and identify the name of the ghost in the haunted castle to avoid staying for the night	Everyone Wins Luxury Team members were exempted from paying their trip fees with Han-na and Haha crossing the longest suspension bridge. Yoo Jae-suk, Lee Kwang-soo and Lee Da-hee were chosen to complete the wing walking penalty while Ji Suk-jin, Jeon So-min and Lee Da-hee must sleep at the haunted castle.
407	July 1, 2018 (June 11, 2018)	Hong Jin-young Kang Han-na Lee Da-hee Lee Sang-yeob	Charles Kuonen Suspension Bridge (Randa, Switzerland) Oxford Castle (Oxford, England, UK)	No teams		Luxury Package: Complete the itinerary and avoid paying the additional fees Shuddering Package: Survive the pop-up pirate roulette challenge to avoid the wing walking and identify the name of the ghost in the haunted castle to avoid staying for the night	Everyone Wins Luxury Team members were exempted from paying their trip fees with Han-na and Haha crossing the longest suspension bridge. Yoo Jae-suk, Lee Kwang-soo and Lee Da-hee were chosen to complete the wing walking penalty while Ji Suk-jin, Jeon So-min and Lee Da-hee must sleep at the haunted castle.
408	July 8, 2018 (June 11–12, 2018)	Hong Jin-young Kang Han-na Lee Da-hee Lee Sang-yeob	Charles Kuonen Suspension Bridge (Randa, Switzerland) Oxford Castle (Oxford, England, UK)	No teams		Luxury Package: Complete the itinerary and avoid paying the additional fees Shuddering Package: Survive the pop-up pirate roulette challenge to avoid the wing walking and identify the name of the ghost in the haunted castle to avoid staying for the night	Everyone Wins Luxury Team members were exempted from paying their trip fees with Han-na and Haha crossing the longest suspension bridge. Yoo Jae-suk, Lee Kwang-soo and Lee Da-hee were chosen to complete the wing walking penalty while Ji Suk-jin, Jeon So-min and Lee Da-hee must sleep at the haunted castle.
409	July 15, 2018 (July 9, 2018)	Han Eun-jung Hwang Chi-yeul Jennie (Blackpink) Jisoo (Blackpink) Pyo Ye-jin Yoon Bo-ra	Ocean World (Hanchigol-gil, Hongcheon County, Gangwon Province)	Yoo Jae-suk & Han Eun-jung Haha & Jeon So-min Ji Suk-jin & Yoon Bo-ra Kim Jong-kook & Jisoo Lee Kwang-soo & Jennie Song Ji-hyo & Hwang Chi-yeul Yang Se-chan & Pyo Ye-jin		Collect 2 heart cards or avoid having both bomb cards	Haha & Jeon So-min Wins Haha and Jeon So-min received a couple rings, Ji Suk-jin and Yoon Bo-ra received a korean beef set, Kim Jong-kook and Jisoo received a red ginseng set. Lee Kwang-soo and Jennie were thrown with water balloons by the other members and guests as penalty.
410 (Note: Special appearances by Henry Cavill, Simon Pegg and Tom Cruise.)	July 22, 2018 (July 17, 2018)	Henry Cavill, Simon Pegg, Tom Cruise (special participation)	Lotte World Tower (Jamsil-dong, Songpa District, Seoul)	R Leader (Song Ji-hyo) R Agency (Haha, Ji Suk-jin, Kim Jong-kook, Lee Kwang-soo)	M Agency (Yoo Jae-suk, Jeon So-min, Yang Se-chan, Henry Cavill, Tom Cruise, Simon Pegg)	Identify the M agency spies before they identify the leader of R agency	R Agency & R Leader Wins R agency members each received a golden badge.
411 (Note: 8th Anniversary Special.)	July 29, 2018 (July 10 & 23, 2018)	No guests	First Garden (Sangjiseok-dong, Paju, Gyeonggi Province)	Mission Team (Kim Jong-kook)	Chasing Team (Yoo Jae-suk, Haha, Ji Suk-jin, Lee Kwang-soo, Song Ji-hyo, Jeon So-min, Yang Se-chan)	Find the culprit who stole Kim Jong-kook's shoes	Mission Team Wins Yoo Jae-suk, Haha, Ji Suk-jin, Lee Kwang-soo, Song Ji-hyo, Jeon So-min and Yang Se-chan got water-bombed. Kim Jong-kook received a pair of shoes. Yang Se-chan was flogged by Kim Jong-kook.
411	July 29, 2018 (July 10 & 23, 2018)	No guests	SBS Prism Tower (Sangam-dong, Mapo District, Seoul)	No teams		Win the No. 8 quiz tournament	Kim Jong-kook Wins Kim Jong-kook was allowed to change the profile pictures and names of the other members for 8 days on the Naver and Daum search engine.
412 (Note: Brief appearances by Park Bo-gum and Park Jeong-min through the phone. Special appearances by Hwasa, Moonbyul, Solar, Wheein (Mamamoo), Jang Do-yeon, Shin Hye-sun and Sung Dong-il) (Note: PD Jeong Cheol-min took a short break with PD Lee Hwan-jin temporarily took over as the main PD.)	August 5, 2018 (July 23, 2018)	No guests	SBS Prism Tower (Sangam-dong, Mapo District, Seoul)	No teams		Win the No. 8 quiz tournament	Kim Jong-kook Wins Kim Jong-kook was allowed to change the profile pictures and names of the other members for 8 days on the Naver and Daum search engine.
413	August 12, 2018 (July 30, 2018)	Jennie (Blackpink) Jin Ki-joo	TBA	Jennie Team (Jennie, Yoo Jae-suk, Lee Kwang-soo, Song Ji-hyo, Yang Se-chan)	Ki-joo Team (Jin Ki-joo, Haha, Ji Suk-jin, Kim Jong-kook, Jeon So-min)	Win the missions to be allowed to give suggestions on the penalties and avoid them	Jennie Team Wins Jin Ki-joo was exempted from the penalties and replaced by Yoo Jae-suk. Yoo Jae-suk, Haha, Ji Suk-jin, Kim Jong-kook and Jeon So-min must eat roasted sweet potatoes and drink hot citrus tea outside while wearing winter jackets as penalty.
414 (Note: Brief appearances by the cast of Fuerza Bruta theater show.)	August 19, 2018 (August 6, 2018)	Kim Roi-ha Kwak Si-yang Seo Hyo-rim	SBS Tanhyeon-dong Production Center (Ilsanseo District, Goyang, Gyeonggi Province)	Mission Team (Yoo Jae-suk, Haha, Ji Suk-jin, Kim Jong-kook, Lee Kwang-soo, Song Ji-hyo, Yang Se-chan, Kim Roi-ha, Seo Hyo-rim)	Architect (Jeon So-min) Assistant (Kwak Si-yang)	Identify and eliminate the architect and the assistant	Architect & Assistant Wins Jeon So-min and Kwak Si-yang each received a coffee truck voucher.
415	August 26, 2018 (August 13, 2018)	Noh Sa-yeon Lee Sang-yeob	First Garden (Sangjiseok-dong, Paju, Gyeonggi Province)	Queen of Death (Noh Sa-yeon) Ugly Man Team (Yoo Jae-suk & Jeon So-min) New Identity Team (Haha & Yang Se-chan) Cheon Seong-im Team (Lee Kwang-soo & Song Ji-hyo) Prosecutors Team (Ji Suk-jin & Kim Jong-kook)		Gain the most Running balls to reincarnate	Ugly Man Team, New Identity Team & Cheon Seong-im Team Wins Prosecutors Team cut onions and make 3 tear drops in a cylinder as a big penalty.
416	September 2, 2018 (August 20 & 27, 2018)	No guests	Studio Art Views (Sampae-dong, Namyangju, Gyeonggi Province)	No teams		Figure out a way to end the race	Everyone Wins
416	September 2, 2018 (August 20 & 27, 2018)	B.I Bobby (iKON) Kim Ji-min Lee Elijah Lee Joo-yeon Lee Si-a Seungri (Big Bang) Sunmi	ChangeUp Campus (Tanhyeon-myeon, Paju, Gyeonggi Province)	Yoo Jae-suk & Lee Si-a Haha & Sunmi Ji Suk-jin & Kim Ji-min Kim Jong-kook & Lee Joo-yeon Lee Kwang-soo & Lee Elijah Song Ji-hyo & Bobby Jeon So-min & Seung-ri Yang Se-chan & B.I		Pay off debts to avoid the penalty	Yoo Jae-suk & Lee Si-a, Ji Suk-jin & Kim Ji-min, Kim Jong-kook & Lee Joo-yeon, Song Ji-hyo & Bobby, Jeon So-min & Seungri Wins Haha & B.I got a spanking, Seungri got spanked once because he went easy on B.I and Kwang-soo got whipped cream on his face and spanked twice.
417	September 9, 2018 (August 27, 2018)	B.I Bobby (iKON) Kim Ji-min Lee Elijah Lee Joo-yeon Lee Si-a Seungri (Big Bang) Sunmi	ChangeUp Campus (Tanhyeon-myeon, Paju, Gyeonggi Province)	Yoo Jae-suk & Lee Si-a Haha & Sunmi Ji Suk-jin & Kim Ji-min Kim Jong-kook & Lee Joo-yeon Lee Kwang-soo & Lee Elijah Song Ji-hyo & Bobby Jeon So-min & Seung-ri Yang Se-chan & B.I		Pay off debts to avoid the penalty	Yoo Jae-suk & Lee Si-a, Ji Suk-jin & Kim Ji-min, Kim Jong-kook & Lee Joo-yeon, Song Ji-hyo & Bobby, Jeon So-min & Seungri Wins Haha & B.I got a spanking, Seungri got spanked once because he went easy on B.I and Kwang-soo got whipped cream on his face and spanked twice.
418 (Note: Special appearances by BamBam, Jackson, JB, Jinyoung, Mark Tuan, Youngjae, Yugyeom (Got7), J-Black, Mmary and Yoo Seung-ok.)	September 16, 2018 (September 3, 2018)	No guests	SBS Broadcasting Center (Mok-dong, Yangcheon District, Seoul)	No teams		Deliver the briefcase to the final destination within 6 hours	Everyone Wins Yang Se-chan was chosen by the roulette in the end and got triple water-bombed penalty.
419 (Note: Chuseok Special.) (Note: Jang Do-yeon acted as a host and only participate in the games when "Jang Do-yeon Chance" is used.)	September 23, 2018 (September 10, 2018)	Jang Do-yeon	SBS Broadcasting Center (Mok-dong, Yangcheon District, Seoul)	Mission Team (Yoo Jae-suk, Ji Suk-jin)	Chasing Team (Haha, Kim Jong-kook, Lee Kwang-soo, Song Ji-hyo, Jeon So-min, Yang Se-chan)	Hide and avoid the chasing team for 20 minutes	Chasing Team Wins Chasing Team received a gift set. Mission Team is required to visit a place that the production team had chosen.
420	September 30, 2018 (September 17, 2018)	No guests	BIFF Square (Nampo-dong, Gudeok-ro, Busan)	Busan Team (Yoo Jae-suk, Ji Suk-jin, Lee Kwang-soo (Note: Lee Kwang-soo was supposed to be on the vacation team, but was called by Yoo Jae-suk to Busan to carry out the punishment mission instead.)) Vacation Team (Haha, Kim Jong-kook, Song Ji-hyo, Jeon So-min, Yang Se-chan)		Busan Team: Complete 100 counts of part-time jobs Vacation Team: Complete the vacation tasks suggested by the members before running out of money	Yoo Jae-suk, Lee Kwang-soo & Vacation Team Wins Vacation Team were exempted from going to Busan. Ji Suk-jin is required to complete the remaining counts of part time jobs.
421 (Note: Special appearance by Hwang Je-sung.)	October 7, 2018 (September 17, 2018)	No guests	BIFF Square (Nampo-dong, Gudeok-ro, Busan)	Busan Team (Yoo Jae-suk, Ji Suk-jin, Lee Kwang-soo) Vacation Team (Haha, Kim Jong-kook, Song Ji-hyo, Jeon So-min, Yang Se-chan)		Busan Team: Complete 100 counts of part-time jobs Vacation Team: Complete the vacation tasks suggested by the members before running out of money	Yoo Jae-suk, Lee Kwang-soo & Vacation Team Wins Vacation Team were exempted from going to Busan. Ji Suk-jin is required to complete the remaining counts of part time jobs.
422	October 14, 2018 (October 1, 2018)	Im Soo-hyang Lee Ha-na	Pyunggang Botanical Garden (Yeongbuk-myeon, Pocheon, Gyeonggi Province)	Face Team (Yoo Jae-suk, Ji Suk-jin, Lee Kwang-soo, Jeon So-min, Im Soo-hyang)	Voice Team (Haha, Kim Jong-kook, Song Ji-hyo, Yang Se-chan, Lee Ha-na)	Avoid having the least money at the end of the race	Face Team Wins Face Team received a set of books, which 1 was given to Lee Ha-na. Ji Suk-jin, Kim Jong-kook, Lee Kwang-soo, Song Ji-hyo, Jeon So-min, Im Soo-hyang and Lee Ha-na were exempted from the penalty. Yoo Jae-suk chose Haha for whipped cream penalty.
423 (Note: Brief appearance by Jang Yoon-ju through the phone) (Note: Haha was the absolute member for the quiz game, while Yoo Jae-suk acted as the absolute member for the door game.)	October 21, 2018 (October 8, 2018)	No guests	Simmons Terrace (Moga-myeon, Icheon, Gyeonggi Province)	No teams		Get the most dots by rolling the dice to become the first-ranked member	Ji Suk-jin Wins Everyone except Ji Suk-jin got their faces thrown with water according to their respective ranks.
424 (Note: Halloween Special.) (Note: Delayed for a week due to the Korean Baseball Championship Games.)	November 4, 2018 (October 15, 2018)	Ahn Hyo-seop Seo Young-hee Son Na-eun (Apink)	Paradise City Hotel & Resort (Yeongjonghaeannam-ro, Jung District, Incheon)	Human Team (Yoo Jae-suk, Haha, Ji Suk-jin, Lee Kwang-soo, Song Ji-hyo, Yang Se-chan, Jeon So-min, Son Na-eun)	Ghost Team (Kim Jong-kook, Ahn Hyo-seop, Seo Young-hee)	Identify and eliminate the ghosts	Human Team Wins Human Team received Gold badges, which Yoo Jae-suk and Haha gave their gold badges to Seo Young-hee and Ahn Hyo-seop respectively.
425	November 11, 2018 (October 16, 2018)	Kim Byeong-ok	Oido Prehistoric Ruins Park (Jeongwang 3-dong, Siheung, Gyeonggi Province)	Siblings Team (Yoo Jae-suk, Ji Suk-jin, Kim Jong-kook, Jeon So-min, Yang Se-chan)	Big Brother Team (Haha, Lee Kwang-soo, Song Ji-hyo, Kim Byeong-ok)	Siblings Team Eliminate the other team Big Brother Team Find 3 items and send them to parcel office	Siblings Team Wins Siblings Team received dried persimmons gift sets. Lee Kwang-soo and Song Ji-hyo were chosen for whipped cream penalty.
426	November 18, 2018 (October 29 & 30, 2018)	No guests	Alver Coffee Shop (Yeoksam-dong, Gangnam District, Seoul)	No teams		Succeed in all given missions to avoid penalty	Everyone Wins
426	November 18, 2018 (October 29 & 30, 2018)	Irene Joy (Red Velvet) Kang Han-na Seol In-ah	ChangeUp Campus (Tanhyeon-myeon, Paju, Gyeonggi Province)	Couples (end pairs) Yoo Jae-suk & Irene Haha & Kang Han-na Ji Suk-jin & Seol In-ah Kim Jong-kook & Joy Lee Kwang-soo & Song Ji-hyo Yang Se-chan & Jeon So-min	Thieves (Kim Jong-kook, Yoo Jae-suk, Seol In-ah, Song Ji-hyo)	Avoid having a thief as your partner to exempt penalty	Haha & Kang Han-na, Yang Se-chan & Jeon So-min, Yoo Jae-suk, Kim Jong-kook, Song Ji-hyo, Seol In-ah Wins Winners each received an undisclosed reward, Joy chose Lee Kwang Soo for whipped cream penalty together.
427	November 25, 2018 (October 30, 2018)	Irene Joy (Red Velvet) Kang Han-na Seol In-ah	ChangeUp Campus (Tanhyeon-myeon, Paju, Gyeonggi Province)	Couples (end pairs) Yoo Jae-suk & Irene Haha & Kang Han-na Ji Suk-jin & Seol In-ah Kim Jong-kook & Joy Lee Kwang-soo & Song Ji-hyo Yang Se-chan & Jeon So-min	Thieves (Kim Jong-kook, Yoo Jae-suk, Seol In-ah, Song Ji-hyo)	Avoid having a thief as your partner to exempt penalty	Haha & Kang Han-na, Yang Se-chan & Jeon So-min, Yoo Jae-suk, Kim Jong-kook, Song Ji-hyo, Seol In-ah Wins Winners each received an undisclosed reward, Joy chose Lee Kwang Soo for whipped cream penalty together.
428	December 2, 2018 (November 12, 2018)	Nayeon Jeongyeon Momo Sana Jihyo Mina Dahyun Chaeyoung Tzuyu (Twice)	SBS Tanhyeon-dong Production Center (Ilsanseo District, Goyang, Gyeonggi Province)	Ramyeon Team (Yoo Jae-suk, Yang Se-chan, Nayeon, Momo) Rice Team (Haha, Jeon So-min, Jeongyeon, Tzuyu) Sweet Potatoes Team (Ji Suk-jin, Lee Kwang-soo, Mina, Dahyun, Chaeyoung) Boiled Meat Team (Kim Jong-kook, Song Ji-hyo, Sana, Jihyo)		Guess the most preferred dish with Kimchi and exempt from penalty	Ramyeon Team Wins Rice Team was chosen to do seasoning on 100 heads of Napa cabbages as penalty.
429 (Note: Year-End Special.)	December 9, 2018 (November 26, 2018)	Byul Lee Si-young	Hangang Park (Han River, Banpo-dong, Seocho District, Seoul)	So-min Team (Jeon So-min, Yoo Jae-suk, Ji Suk-jin) Si-young Team (Lee Si-young, Haha, Lee Kwang-soo) Ji-hyo Team (Song Ji-hyo, Kim Jong-kook, Yang Se-chan, Byul)		Re-challenging the past missions that the Running Man members had previously failed this year	Si-young Team & Ji-hyo Team Wins Ji Suk-jin & Lee Kwang-soo was chosen for the whipped cream penalty.
430	December 16, 2018 (November 26–27, 2018)	Byul Lee Si-young	Hangang Park (Han River, Banpo-dong, Seocho District, Seoul)	So-min Team (Jeon So-min, Yoo Jae-suk, Ji Suk-jin) Si-young Team (Lee Si-young, Haha, Lee Kwang-soo) Ji-hyo Team (Song Ji-hyo, Kim Jong-kook, Yang Se-chan, Byul)		Re-challenging the past missions that the Running Man members had previously failed this year	Si-young Team & Ji-hyo Team Wins Ji Suk-jin & Lee Kwang-soo was chosen for the whipped cream penalty.
431 (Note: Christmas Special.) (Note: Brief appearance by Joo Byung-jin through the phone.)	December 16, 2018 (November 26–27, 2018)	Byul Lee Si-young	Hangang Park (Han River, Banpo-dong, Seocho District, Seoul)	So-min Team (Jeon So-min, Yoo Jae-suk, Ji Suk-jin) Si-young Team (Lee Si-young, Haha, Lee Kwang-soo) Ji-hyo Team (Song Ji-hyo, Kim Jong-kook, Yang Se-chan, Byul)		Re-challenging the past missions that the Running Man members had previously failed this year	Si-young Team & Ji-hyo Team Wins Ji Suk-jin & Lee Kwang-soo was chosen for the whipped cream penalty.
431	December 16, 2018 (November 26–27, 2018)	Han Sun-hwa Hwang Chi-yeul Jeon Hye-bin Park Ha-na Sooyoung (Girls' Generation) Sung Hoon	SBS Tanhyeon-dong Production Center (Ilsanseo District, Goyang, Gyeonggi Province)	Civilian Team (Yoo Jae-suk, Haha, Kim Jong-kook, Song Ji-hyo, Jeon So-min, Yang Se-chan, Han Sun-hwa, Hwang Chi-yeul, Jeon Hye-bin, Park Ha-na)	Furious Santa Team (Ji Suk-jin, Lee Kwang-soo) Assistants (Sooyoung, Sung Hoon)	Civilian Team: Identify and eliminate all Furious Santas and their assistants Furious Santa Team: Steal 6 chosen items of other Running Man members and deliver them to newbie producer	Civilian Team Wins Jeon So-min & Hwang Chi-yeul each received a health supplement gift set. Sooyoung & Sung Hoon received the whipped cream penalty. Ji Suk-jin and Lee Kwang-soo will receive the punishment next week.
432 (Note: Brief appearance by Lee Elijah.)	December 30, 2018 (December 3, 2018)	Han Sun-hwa Hwang Chi-yeul Jeon Hye-bin Park Ha-na Sooyoung (Girls' Generation) Sung Hoon	SBS Tanhyeon-dong Production Center (Ilsanseo District, Goyang, Gyeonggi Province)	Civilian Team (Yoo Jae-suk, Haha, Kim Jong-kook, Song Ji-hyo, Jeon So-min, Yang Se-chan, Han Sun-hwa, Hwang Chi-yeul, Jeon Hye-bin, Park Ha-na)	Furious Santa Team (Ji Suk-jin, Lee Kwang-soo) Assistants (Sooyoung, Sung Hoon)	Civilian Team: Identify and eliminate all Furious Santas and their assistants Furious Santa Team: Steal 6 chosen items of other Running Man members and deliver them to newbie producer	Civilian Team Wins Jeon So-min & Hwang Chi-yeul each received a health supplement gift set. Sooyoung & Sung Hoon received the whipped cream penalty. Ji Suk-jin and Lee Kwang-soo will receive the punishment next week.

== Viewership ==
Average TV viewership ratings
Ep.	Original broadcast date	Nielsen Korea		TNmS
Ep.	Original broadcast date	Nationwide	Seoul	Nationwide
384	January 7, 2018	8.5% (10th)	8.3% (12th)	7.7% (12th)
385	January 14, 2018	8.6% (11th)	9.0% (11th)	7.3% (13th)
386	January 21, 2018	8.6% (12th)	8.5% (12th)	7.5% (11th)
387	January 28, 2018	9.6% (11th)	9.6% (11th)	8.6% (10th)
388	February 4, 2018	9.2% (12th)	9.9% (10th)	10.2% (10th)
389	February 18, 2018	7.8% (13th)	7.7% (13th)	7.8% (15th)
390	March 4, 2018	7.7% (13th)	8.2% (14th)	8.1% (11th)
391	March 11, 2018	7.0% (15th)	7.8% (11th)	7.8% (13th)
392	March 18, 2018	9.2% (12th)	10.4% (9th)	9.1% (11th)
393	March 25, 2018	8.1% (14th)	8.5% (15th)	7.3% (18th)
394	April 1, 2018	8.2% (14th)	8.4% (15th)	8.9% (13th)
395	April 8, 2018	7.3% (15th)	7.6% (16th)	6.9% (17th)
396	April 15, 2018	6.9% (15th)	6.8% (16th)	7.8% (14th)
397	April 22, 2018	7.4% (14th)	7.6% (14th)	8.4% (15th)
398	April 29, 2018	6.8% (15th)	6.9% (15th)	7.1% (16th)
399	May 6, 2018	6.8% (15th)	6.6% (16th)	7.6% (14th)
400	May 13, 2018	7.6% (14th)	7.9% (13th)	8.3% (15th)
401	May 20, 2018	5.7% (18th)	5.9% (18th)	8.2% (16th)
402	May 27, 2018	6.9% (13th)	6.7% (16th)	5.8% (18th)
403	June 3, 2018	6.6% (15th)	6.1% (18th)	7.0% (16th)
404	June 10, 2018	6.9% (15th)	6.7% (18th)	7.4% (15th)
405	June 17, 2018	7.2% (14th)	7.1% (17th)	7.7% (14th)
406	June 24, 2018	7.6% (14th)	7.8% (15th)	8.3% (11th)
407	July 1, 2018	7.9% (14th)	8.5% (13th)	7.1% (19th)
408	July 8, 2018	6.8% (14th)	6.2% (17th)	7.9% (14th)
409	July 15, 2018	7.1% (15th)	6.8% (17th)	8.3% (15th)
410	July 22, 2018	6.8% (17th)	7.1% (17th)	11.1% (7th)
411	July 29, 2018	6.5% (16th)	6.9% (15th)	8.8% (12th)
412	August 5, 2018	7.2% (14th)	7.4% (14th)	7.8% (14th)
413	August 12, 2018	7.0% (14th)	7.0% (14th)	7.3% (13th)
414	August 19, 2018	7.5% (10th)	5.8% (15th)	9.4% (9th)
415	August 26, 2018	8.0% (11th)	5.3% (19th)	—N/a
416	September 2, 2018	7.3% (11th)	7.5% (9th)	8.7% (8th)
417	September 9, 2018	7.5% (15th)	7.7% (15th)	8.7% (12th)
418	September 16, 2018	8.0% (15th)	8.3% (14th)	8.0% (15th)
419	September 23, 2018	6.6% (15th)	6.8% (15th)	6.3% (15th)
420	September 30, 2018	7.3% (16th)	7.9% (16th)	7.3% (18th)
421	October 7, 2018	6.4% (16th)	6.6% (17th)	7.7% (15th)
422	October 14, 2018	6.9% (17th)	7.4% (16th)	8.1% (16th)
423	October 21, 2018	7.4% (15th)	7.9% (13th)	7.4% (16th)
424	November 4, 2018	7.9% (15th)	8.4% (12th)	8.2% (11th)
425	November 11, 2018	6.8% (18th)	7.0% (18th)	7.1% (19th)
426	November 18, 2018	7.0% (17th)	7.5% (16th)	8.8% (15th)
427	November 25, 2018	8.1% (15th)	8.1% (14th)	9.1% (13th)
428	December 2, 2018	7.6% (17th)	7.7% (16th)	8.6% (15th)
429	December 9, 2018	8.1% (18th)	8.7% (16th)	9.0% (15th)
430	December 16, 2018	8.0% (17th)	8.3% (17th)	8.7% (15th)
431	December 23, 2018	7.2% (16th)	6.9% (18th)	8.7% (12th)
432	December 30, 2018	7.6% (13th)	7.8% (13th)	8.1% (13th)
TNmS ratings listed is the highest ratings amongst ratings for each episodes.; "—" denotes episode didn't enter top 20 in Nielsen Korea or TNmS ratings.
