= List of Running Man episodes (2016) =

- No. of episodes: 52

Release
- Original network: SBS
- Original release: January 3 – December 25, 2016

Season chronology
- ← Previous; 2015 Next → 2017

This is a list of episodes of the South Korean variety show Running Man in 2016. The show airs on SBS as part of their Good Sunday lineup.

== Episodes ==
List of episodes (episode 280–331)
Ep.	Broadcast Date (Filming Date)	Guest(s)	Landmark	Teams		Mission	Results
280 (Note: New Year's Special.)	January 3, 2016 (December 21, 2015)	No guests	SBS Tanhyeon-dong Production Center (Ilsanseo-gu, Goyang, Gyeonggi Province)	SNS Food Bingo: No teams Tongue Twister Game: Red Team (Yoo Jae-suk, Haha, Jee Seok-jin, Lee Kwang-soo); Blue Team (Gary, Kim Jong-kook, Song Ji-hyo)	Comment Speed Race & SNS Targeted Name Tag Elimination: No teams	Use social media to complete the missions, obtain the Running Balls and avoid the final punishment	Yoo Jae-suk, Gary, Haha, Jee Seok-jin, Kim Jong-kook, Song Ji-hyo Wins; Lee Kwang-soo wore the monkey outfit and distributed all of the monkey dolls in public as a penalty.
281 (Note: Lim Ji-yeon acted as a host and only participate in the games when "Lim Ji-yeon Chance" is used.)	January 10, 2016 (December 22, 2015)	Lim Ji-yeon	HS Ville (Cheongpyeong-myeon, Gapyeong County, Gyeonggi Province)	No teams		Obtain all the spaces to defeat the other members	Gary Wins; Gary received a 4-pax travel trip to Jeju Province, which was given to Lim Ji-yeon.
282 (Note: Special appearance by Hong Yoon-hwa who appeared as a story narrator, host & the evil witch.)	January 17, 2016 (January 4, 2016)	Go Ah-sung Lee Hee-joon Si-wan (ZE:A)	Herbnara Farm (Bongpyeong-myeon, Pyeongchang County, Gangwon Province)	Ji-hyo Family (Song Ji-hyo, Haha, Kim Jong-kook, Lee Kwang-soo, Si-wan)	Ah-sung Family (Go Ah-sung, Yoo Jae-suk, Gary, Jee Seok-jin, Lee Hee-joon)	Rescue all teammates and escape the frozen village	Ji-hyo Family Wins
283 (Note: Special appearance by manager Choi Kang-hee, Lee Dong-gook & Song Joong-ki in the charity football match and Han Kook-young, Jung Il-woo, Kim Dong-jin, Kim Jae-sung, Kim Tae-young who also participated in the last game.)	January 24, 2016 (January 10, 2016)	Ji So-yun Jong Tae-se Park Ji-sung	Parkson Newcore City Mall (Changning, Shanghai, China)	Wake Up Mission! Morning PK: No teams Smile Cup Charity Football Match: Ji-sung Team vs. So-yun Team vs. Tae-se Team	Tactical Name Tag Elimination: Ji-sung Team (Park Ji-sung, Yoo Jae-suk, Haha, Han Kook-young, Kim Dong-jin); So-yun Team (Ji So-yun, Gary, Song Ji-hyo, Jung Il-woo, Kim Jae-sung); Tae-se Team (Jong Tae-se, Jee Seok-jin, Kim Jong-kook, Lee Kwang-soo, Kim Tae-young)	Defeat the other teams	So-yun Team Wins; So-yun Team each receives a golden ball trophy.
284	January 31, 2016 (January 11, 2016)	Ji So-yun Jong Tae-se Park Ji-sung	Shanghai Film Park (Shanghai, China)	Secret Society Team (Park Ji-sung, Gary, Haha, Jee Seok-jin, Kim Jong-kook, Lee Kwang-soo, Song Ji-hyo, Ji So-yun, Jong Tae-se)	Spy Team (Yoo Jae-suk)	Find the military funds, identify Agent 'J' and go to headquarters or eliminate the spy who wants to eliminate Agent 'J'	Secret Society Team Wins
285 (Note: Seollal Special.)	February 7, 2016 (January 25, 2016)	No guests	Dwight School Seoul (Sangam-dong, Mapo District, Seoul)	No teams		Defeat the other members	Haha Wins; Haha received a travel trip to London.
286 (Note: Special appearance by actor Yeom Dong-heon as the policeman who record the members guess of who is the culprit.)	February 14, 2016 (January 26, 2016)	Kim Ga-yeon	Gapyeong National Tourist Cabins (Deokhyeon-ri, Sang-myeon, Gapyeong County, Gyeonggi Province	Mission Team (Yoo Jae-suk, Gary, Jee Seok-jin, Kim Jong-kook, Lee Kwang-soo, Song Ji-hyo)	Culprit Team (Haha, Kim Ga-yeon)	Find clues about the culprit who have stolen the necklace and murdered the guard and the housekeeper	Gary Wins; Gary received a "Sherlock" travel trip to London and will go with Haha who had also previously received a trip to London [see ep 285].
287	February 21, 2016 (February 1, 2016)	Ahn Gil-kang Kim Do-kyun Kim Jo-han Kim Won-hae Lee Hong-ryul Park Mi-sun Yoo Yul	SBS Prism Tower (Sangam-dong, Mapo District, Seoul)	Yoo Jae-suk & Yoo Yul; Gary & Ahn Gil-kang; Haha & Park Mi-sun; Jee Seok-jin & Lee Hong-ryul; Kim Jong-kook & Kim Do-kyun; Lee Kwang-soo & Kim Jo-han; Song Ji-hyo & Kim Won-hae		Find coloured name tags, attach it to the roulette and avoid being chosen to pay for dinner	Yoo Jae-suk & Yoo Yul, Gary & Ahn Gil-kang, Kim Jong-kook & Kim Do-kyun, Jee Seok-jin & Lee Hong-ryul, Song Ji-hyo & Kim Won-hae, Lee Kwang-soo & Kim Jo-han Wins; Haha & Park Mi-sun must pay for the dinner. The other guests received R golden employee ID cards as a token of gratitude.
288	February 28, 2016 (February 15, 2016)	No guests	Gimpo International Airport (Gangseo District, Seoul)	No teams		Complete visiting all 7 Restaurants within 12 Hours and avoid the penalty	Everyone Wins; Running Man members each received an 'R' golden spoon.
289	March 6, 2016 (February 21, 2016)	Jung Il-woo Lee Da-hae	Al Maha Resort (Dubai, U.A.E.)	No teams		Complete missions from various places and earn 10 stars	Gary, Kim Jong-kook, Song Ji-hyo, Jung II-woo, Lee Da-hae Wins; Yoo Jae-suk, Haha, Jee Seok-jin, Lee Kwang-soo must sleep in the desert. (Note: Only the first 5 people who earn 10 stamps are allowed to sleep in the luxurious Al Maha Resort while the others must sleep in the desert.)
290	March 13, 2016 (February 21–22, 2016)	Jung Il-woo Lee Da-hae	Bastakiah Nights (Dubai, U.A.E.)	White Team (Yoo Jae-suk, Jee Seok-jin, Lee Da-hae); Black Team (Haha, Kim Jong-kook, Jung Il-woo); Orange Team (Gary, Lee Kwang-soo, Song Ji-hyo)		Turn your hourglass before the upper bulb is empty and defeat the other teams	White Team Wins
291 (Note: This episode is focused on Questions & Answers session with the members.)	March 20, 2016 (March 14, 2016)	No guests	SBS Open Hall (Deungchon-dong, Gangseo-gu)	No missions			
292	March 27, 2016 (March 15, 2016)	Hong Jin-ho Jeong Jeong-ah Kang Hyeon-soo Lee Wan Lizzy (After School) Mikey (Turbo) Nam Chang-hee Park Myeong-ho Wax	SBS Broadcasting Center (Mok-dong, Yangcheon District, Seoul)	Elevator of luck: No teams (Note: Only Yoo Jae-suk, Haha, Jee Seok-jin, Lee Kwang-soo are allowed to participate in the game. This game determined the team leader of each team.)	Unlucky Hand 1st Festival: Jae-suk Team (Yoo Jae-suk, Jeong Jeong-ah, Kang Hyeon-soo, Lee Wan, Nam Chang-hee); Seok-jin Team (Jee Seok-jin, Gary, Song Ji-hyo, Park Myeong-ho, Wax); Kwang-soo Team (Lee Kwang-soo, Haha, Kim Jong-kook, Hong Jin-ho, Lizzy, Mikey)	Aim to lose during missions to win the race	Jee Seok-jin Wins; Jee Seok-jin received a golden trophy and the guests received gifts as a token of appreciation.
293 (Note: Special appearances by Park Bo-gum, Seo-hyun (Girls' Generation), Seolhyun (AOA), and Yoo Yeon-seok)	April 3, 2016 (March 21, 2016)	No guests	TBD	No teams		Get the gold badges and go home (Note: Every decision in this race must be decided with majority votes. If there was a unanimous vote, the members have to face a special penalty.)	Gary, Haha, Jee Seok-jin, Kim Jong-kook, Lee Kwang-soo, Song Ji-hyo Wins; Yoo Jae-suk chose Jee Seok-jin to go with him and play a children's song with a piano in abandoned amusement park Yongma Land.
294 (Note: Kim Jong-kook is absent in this episode to attend an awards ceremony in China. He performs 3 missions against machines on his own which the other members need to guess his results.) (Note: Special appearance by announcer Kim Hwan.)	April 10, 2016 (March 29, 2016)	Hyeri (Girl's Day) Nam Tae-hyun Song Min-ho (Winner)	SBS Broadcasting Center (Mok-dong, Yangcheon District, Seoul)	Human vs. Machine: Team 1 (Yoo Jae-suk, Hyeri, Nam Tae-hyun); Team 2 (Gary, Haha, Song Min-ho); Team 3 (Jee Seok-jin, Lee Kwang-soo, Song Ji-hyo)	AI Kungkungdda: No teams	Defeat an AI in a word chain game	Hyeri Wins; Hyeri lost against the AI but survived until the final round. Hyeri received a set of electromagnetic shielding equipment.
295 (Note: Special appearance by Jo Seok, Kyuhyun (Super Junior), Lee Yo-won, Moon Hee-joon and Park Seo-joon.)	April 17, 2016 (April 11, 2016)	No guests	Nanji Camp (Sangam-dong, Mapo District, Seoul)	No missions			
296 (Note: Special appearance by Chae Young-in, Lee Moon-se, Lee Seung-joon, Yoon Gun, Jee Seok-jin's nurse in high school, Kim Jong-kook's mother and Lee Kwang-soo's first love.)	April 24, 2016 (April 12, 2016)	No guests	Marco's Attic – Coffee, Food & Vintage (Hyoja-dong, Jongno District, Seoul)	No teams		Find your "first love" within 12 hours, complete the missions and avoid the penalty	Everyone Wins
297 (Note: Special appearance by David Lee McInnis.)	May 1, 2016 (April 25, 2016)	Eunseo (Cosmic Girls) Jin Goo Kim Ji-won	Wolmi Theme Park (Wolmimunhwa-ro, Jung District, Incheon)	Yoo Jae-suk & Kim Ji-won; Gary & Jee Seok-jin; Haha & Kim Jong-kook; Lee Kwang-soo & Eun-seo; Song Ji Hyo & Jin Goo	Red Sun (Jin Goo)	Rank higher than the "Red Sun" to avoid the penalty	Jin Goo Wins; Gary, Haha and Lee Kwang-soo ride the Viking as a punishment.
298	May 8, 2016 (April 26, 2016)	Go Ara Kim Sung-kyun Lee Je-hoon	Baekseokcheon Neighborhood Park (Uijeongbu-dong, Uijeongbu, Gyeonggi Province)	Road Mission Show: No Team (Yoo Jae-suk, Gary, Kim Jong-kook, Song Ji Hyo, Kim Sung-kyun); Yes Team (Haha, Jee Seok-jin, Lee Kwang-soo, Go Ara, Lee Je-hoon); Hanging Leg Wrestling: No Team (Jee Seok-jin, Kim Jong-kook, Lee Kwang-soo, Kim Sung-kyun, Lee Je-hoon); Yes Team (Yoo Jae-suk, Gary, Haha, Song Ji-hyo, Go Ara)	No Man (Kim Jong-kook)	Find the "No Man"	Kim Jong-kook Wins; Yoo Jae-suk, Gary, Haha, Jee Seok-jin, Lee Kwang-soo, Song Ji-hyo, Go Ara, Kim Sung-kyun, Lee Je-hoon got mud-bombed penalty for guessing the wrong "No Man"
299 (Note: Hong Jin-young had to leave early due to scheduling conflicts.)	May 15, 2016 (May 3, 2016)	Hong Jin-young Jo Bo-ah Kyung Soo-jin Stephanie Lee Uhm Hyun-kyung Yoo In-young Zico (Block B)	Rolling Hills Hotel (Hwalcho-dong, Hwaseong-si, Gyeonggi Province)	Yoo Jae-suk & Yoo In-young; Gary & Kyung Soo-jin; Haha & Stephanie Lee; Jee Seok-jin & Jo Bo-ah; Kim Jong-kook & Hong Jin-young; Lee Kwang-soo & Uhm Hyun-kyung; Song Ji-hyo & Zico		Aim the centre position	Song Ji-hyo & Zico Wins; Song Ji-hyo and Zico get the gold champion cup. Yoo Jae-suk, Yoo In-young, Gary, Kyung Soo-jin, Haha, Stephanie Lee, Jee Seok-jin, Jo Bo-ah, Kim Jong-kook, Lee Kwang-soo and Uhm Hyun-kyung wear blue outfits and stand in front of the blue screen as punishment. (Note: Yoo Jae-suk, Haha and Stephanie Lee also get their face painted with blue paint penalty as they have the fewest points.)
300 (Note: 300th episode Special.) (Note: Special appearance by J-Hope, Jimin, Jin, Jungkook, Rap Monster, Suga, V (BTS).)	May 22, 2016 (May 9, 2016)	BTS	Yangpyeong Valley (Baegan-gil, Yangpyeong-eup, Yangpyeong County, Gyeonggi Province)	7 vs & 7 vs 300 meters: No teams 7 vs 300 bowls: Running Man Team vs. VJ Team; 7 vs 300 boxes: Running Man Team (Yoo Jae-suk, Gary, Haha, Jee Seok-jin, Kim Jong-kook, Lee Kwang-soo, Song Ji-hyo); BTS Team (J-Hope, Jimin, Jin, Jungkook, Rap Monster, Suga, V)	7 vs 300 peoples: Running Man Team vs. 300 People Team; Pillow Fight & 7 vs 300 kg: No teams	Find the weight scale based on the map puzzle, weigh yourselves. Only 300 kg of weight can get in the car and go home	Yoo Jae-suk, Gary, Lee Kwang-soo, Song Ji-hyo Wins; Haha, Jee Seok-jin, Kim Jong Kook must walk to Yangpyeong Station as punishment.
301	May 29, 2016 (May 9, 2016)	BTS	Yangpyeong Valley (Baegan-gil, Yangpyeong-eup, Yangpyeong County, Gyeonggi Province)	7 vs & 7 vs 300 meters: No teams 7 vs 300 bowls: Running Man Team vs. VJ Team; 7 vs 300 boxes: Running Man Team (Yoo Jae-suk, Gary, Haha, Jee Seok-jin, Kim Jong-kook, Lee Kwang-soo, Song Ji-hyo); BTS Team (J-Hope, Jimin, Jin, Jungkook, Rap Monster, Suga, V)	7 vs 300 peoples: Running Man Team vs. 300 People Team; Pillow Fight & 7 vs 300 kg: No teams	Find the weight scale based on the map puzzle, weigh yourselves. Only 300 kg of weight can get in the car and go home	Yoo Jae-suk, Gary, Lee Kwang-soo, Song Ji-hyo Wins; Haha, Jee Seok-jin, Kim Jong Kook must walk to Yangpyeong Station as punishment.
302 (Note: Special appearance by Jun Hyo-seong, Oh Ha-young, Yoon Bo-mi through the phone.) (Note: The Twice members only participates in the final mission.)	June 5, 2016 (May 24, 2016)	Nayeon Jeongyeon Momo Sana Jihyo Mina Dahyun Chaeyoung Tzuyu (Twice) Yeo Jin-goo	Ganghwa History Museum (Ganghwa-daero, Ganghwa County, Incheon)	Ingredient Gathering War: Blue Team (Yoo Jae-suk, Gary, Jee Seok-jin, Lee Kwang-soo); White Team (Haha, Kim Jong-kook, Song Ji-hyo, Yeo Jin-goo)	Dangerous Recipe: Blue Team (Yoo Jae-suk, Gary, Jee Seok-jin, Lee Kwang-soo, Chaeyoung, Jihyo, Momo, Nayeon, Sana); White Team (Haha, Kim Jong-kook, Song Ji-hyo, Da-hyun, Jeong-yeon, Mina, Tzuyu, Yeo Jin-goo)	Eliminate the other team members, but avoid eliminating the "pepper bomb" member	Blue Team Wins; White Team members each eat dishes that tasted strong but healthy as punishment.
303	June 12, 2016 (May 31, 2016)	Ahn Sung-ki Han Ye-ri Cho Jin-woong Kwon Yul	Memorial Monument of Hill 104 (Yeonhui-dong, Seodaemun District, Seoul)	Prey Team (Yoo Jae-suk, Gary, Haha, Jee Seok-jin, Kim Jong-kook, Lee Kwang-soo, Song Ji-hyo)	Hunter Team (Ahn Sung-ki, Han Ye-ri, Cho Jin-woong, Kwon Yul)	Defeat the other team (Note: When a Hunter Team member eliminated a Prey Team member, the latter would become a member of the Hunter Team.)	Hunter Team Wins; Hunter Team received 4 gold badges.
304 (Note: Special appearance by Kim So-hui.)	June 12, 2016 (May 31, 2016)	Ahn Sung-ki Han Ye-ri Cho Jin-woong Kwon Yul	Memorial Monument of Hill 104 (Yeonhui-dong, Seodaemun District, Seoul)	Prey Team (Yoo Jae-suk, Gary, Haha, Jee Seok-jin, Kim Jong-kook, Lee Kwang-soo, Song Ji-hyo)	Hunter Team (Ahn Sung-ki, Han Ye-ri, Cho Jin-woong, Kwon Yul)	Defeat the other team	Hunter Team Wins; Hunter Team received 4 gold badges.
304	June 19, 2016 (June 14, 2016)	Kim Min-seok Lee Sung-kyung Park Shin-hye Yoon Kyun-sang	Seoul Women's University (Gongneung-dong, Nowon District, Seoul)	Queen Olympics: Queen Ji-hyo Team (Song Ji-hyo, Kim Min-seok, Yoon Kyun-sang); Queen Shin-hye Team (Park Shin-hye, Yoo Jae-suk, Jee Seok-jin, Kim Jong-kook); Queen Sung-kyung Team (Lee Sung-kyung, Gary, Haha, Lee Kwang-soo)	Guess the Queen: Queen Ji-hyo Team (Song Ji-Hyo); Queen Shin-hye Team (Park Shin-hye, Yoo Jae-suk, Gary, Kim Min-seok); Queen Sung-kyung Team (Lee Sung-kyung, Haha, Jee Seok-jin, Kim Jong-kook, Lee Kwang-soo, Yoon Kyun-sang)	Guess the real Queen and join her team to defeat other Queen team and avoid punishment	Queen Sung-kyung Team Wins; Lee Sung-kyung receives a Diamond Tiara. Yoo Jae-suk, Gary and Kim Min-seok receive flogging punishment for guessing the wrong queen.
305 (Note: Special appearance by Kim Heung-gook as the referee and Bae Sung-jae, Park Moon-sung as the commentators.)	June 26, 2016 (June 13, 2016)	Jo Se-ho Kim Dong-hyun Kim Jun-hyun Lee Jung-jin Lee Kyung-kyu Lee Soo-min Yoo Jae-hwan	TBD	Running Man Team (Yoo Jae-suk, Gary, Haha, Jee Seok-jin, Kim Jong-kook, Lee Kwang-soo, Song Ji-hyo)	Avengers Team (Lee Kyung-kyu, Jo Se-ho, Kim Dong-hyun, Kim Jun-hyun, Lee Jung-jin, Lee Soo-min, Yoo Jae-hwan)	Defeat the other team	Running Man Team Wins; Running Man Team receive 7 gold badges.
306	July 3, 2016 (June 28, 2016)	Kyungri (Nine Muses) Lee Ki-woo Nichkhun (2PM)	Hanagae Beach (Muui-dong, Jung District, Incheon)	Blue Team (Yoo Jae-suk, Gary, Jee Seok-jin, Lee Kwang-soo, Kyungri)	Red Team (Haha, Kim Jong-kook, Song Ji-hyo, Lee Ki-woo, Nichkhun)	Get the highest overall score	Red Team Wins; Kim Jong-kook promoted as Captain and received a golden badge and the rest of Red team received golden whistles. All Blue Team members, except Kyungri, received flogging.
307	July 10, 2016 (July 5, 2016)	Bo-ra Da-som Hyo-rin So-you (Sistar) Shownu (Monsta X)	Animation Museum & Robot Studio (Baksa-ro, Seo-myeon, Chuncheon, Gangwon Province)	Yoo Jae-suk & Da-som; Gary & Hyo-rin; Haha & Jee Seok-jin; Kim Jong-kook & So-you; Lee Kwang-soo & Bo-ra; Song Ji-hyo & Shownu		Defeat the other teams	Song Ji-hyo & Shownu Wins; Song Ji-hyo & Shownu received a pair of diamond couple ring.
308	July 17, 2016 (July 4, 2016)	Ji Jin-hee Kim Hee-ae	SBS Broadcasting Center (Mok-dong, Yangcheon District, Seoul)	Pink Team (Yoo Jae-suk, Gary, Kim Hee-ae); Blue Team (Haha, Lee Kwang-soo, Ji Jin-hee); Yellow Team (Jee Seok-jin, Kim Jong-kook, Song Ji-hyo)	Agent H (Kim Jong-kook, Kim Hee-ae)	Avoid or disturb Agent H Special Missions and take your team to be the winner. Agent H mission: Make the 8th person team be a second winner in each mission and make the 8th person the 2nd to last being ousted in the last mission	Pink Team Wins; Agent H failed to clear their special missions and Pink team received 5 vouchers of invigorating food.
309	July 24, 2016 (July 12, 2016)	Hong Jin-kyung Lee Ki-woo Seo Jang-hoon	Myongji College (Hongeun 2-dong, Seodaemun District, Seoul)	Running Man Team (Yoo Jae-suk, Gary, Haha, Jee Seok-jin, Kim Jong-kook, Song Ji-hyo)	Giraffe Team (Lee Kwang-soo, Hong Jin-kyung, Lee Ki-woo, Seo Jang-hoon)	Defeat the other team	Running Man Team Wins; Running Man Team received a voucher to visit Lee Kwang-soo's house.
310	July 31, 2016 (July 18, 2016)	Ha Jae-sook Oh Yeon-seo Soo Ae	Hapcheon Image Theme Park (Hapcheon, Gyeongsang)	White Team (Soo Ae, Gary, Haha, Kim Jong-kook, Ha Jae-sook)	Black Team (Oh Yeon-seo, Yoo Jae-suk, Jee Seok-jin, Lee Kwang-soo, Song Ji-hyo)	Win the ice hockey match	Black Team Wins; Black Team each receive a gold medal.
311 (Note: Special appearance by Kim Je-dong through the phone.)	July 31, 2016 (July 18, 2016)	Ha Jae-sook Oh Yeon-seo Soo Ae	Hapcheon Image Theme Park (Hapcheon, Gyeongsang)	White Team (Soo Ae, Gary, Haha, Kim Jong-kook, Ha Jae-sook)	Black Team (Oh Yeon-seo, Yoo Jae-suk, Jee Seok-jin, Lee Kwang-soo, Song Ji-hyo)	Win the ice hockey match	Black Team Wins; Black Team each receive a gold medal.
311	August 7, 2016 (July 18 & 19, 2016)	No guests	The ARC River Culture Pavilion (Dasa-eup, Dalseong County, Daegu)	No teams		Solve the mysterious cube	Kim Jong-kook Wins; Kim Jong-kook received a Special Badge from the 'Invigorating Foods Special' and a dinner voucher to eat Hungarian cuisine.
312 (Note: Special appearance by Kim Min-a.) (Note: Special appearance by Bae Sung-jae, Han Hye-jin, Im Jin-mo, Jo Seok, Kim Eana, Park Bo-young, Song Eun-i as the judges.)	August 14, 2016 (July 26, 2016)	Bada Jo Jung-chi (Shinchireem) Kim Kyung-ho Yoo Byung-jae Yoon Jong-shin	Gyeonggi English Village Yangpyeong Camp (Yongmun-myeon, Yangpyeong County, Gyeonggi Province)	Singer Team (Gary, Haha, Jee Seok-jin, Kim Jong-kook, Bada, Yoo Byung-jae)	Non-singer Team (Yoo Jae-suk, Lee Kwang-soo, Song Ji-hyo, Jo Jung-chi, Kim Kyung-ho, Yoon Jong-shin)	Get the higher score from reviewers and audiences	Singer Team Wins; Singer team receive two special badges, four golden musical badges and dinner voucher to eat Hungarian Food as Kim Jong-kook left behind the voucher from previous episode [see ep 311].
313 (Note: Special appearance by Ahn Gil-kang.)	August 21, 2016 (August 8, 2016)	Ahn Mun-sook Ha Jae-sook Kim Se-jeong (Gugudan) Mijoo (Lovelyz) Noh Sa-yeon	Kookmin University (Jeongneung-ro, Seongbuk District, Seoul)	Yoo Jae-suk & Kim Se-jeong; Gary & Song Ji-hyo; Haha & Ha Jae-sook; Jee Seok-jin & Ahn Mun-sook; Kim Jong-kook & Noh Sa-yeon; Lee Kwang-soo & Lee Mi-joo		Defeat the other team	Gary & Song Ji-hyo Wins; Gary and Song Ji-hyo receive a golden badge and a golden Tiara.
314	August 28, 2016 (August 16, 2016)	Hong Jong-hyun Kang Ha-neul Lee Joon-gi	SBS Tanhyeon-dong Production Center (Ilsanseo-gu, Goyang, Gyeonggi Province)	No teams		Defeat the other members to be the next Prince	Kim Jong-kook Wins
315 (Note: Special appearance by Kim Hwan, Lee Hye-jung as the judges.)	September 4, 2016 (August 23, 2016)	Cha Seung-won	Hangang Park (Han River, Yeouido-dong, Yeongdeungpo District, Seoul)	Blue Team (Yoo Jae-suk, Haha, Lee Kwang-soo, Cha Seung-won)	White Team (Gary, Jee Seok-jin, Kim Jong-kook, Song Ji-hyo)	Grab the flag after completing the map	Cha Seung-won Wins; Cha Seung-won received a golden compass.
316 (Note: Special appearance by BamBam, Jackson, JB, Jin-young, Mark, Youngjae, Yugyeom (Got7), Hyo-rin (Sistar).)	September 11, 2016 (August 29, 2016)	No guests	Honam High Speed Railway Depot (Sanjeong-dong, Gwangsan District, Gwangju)	No teams		Escape the train before it reaches the destination to avoid the penalty	Everyone Wins
317	September 18, 2016 (September 6, 2016)	Han Hye-jin Key (Shinee) Kim Dong-hyun Lee Kyung-kyu Moon Hee-joon Sung Hoon Yoon Hyung-bin	Starfield Hanam (Sinjang-dong, Hanam, Gyeonggi Province)	Running Man Team (Yoo Jae-suk, Gary, Haha, Jee Seok-jin, Kim Jong-kook, Lee Kwang-soo, Song Ji-hyo)	Avengers Team (Lee Kyung-kyu, Han Hye-jin, Key, Kim Dong-hyun, Moon Hee-joon, Sung Hoon, Yoon Hyung-bin)	Eliminate the other team members, but avoid eliminating the "Unlucky" member (Note: Eliminating the "Lucky" member allows the team to eliminate another desired member of the opposing team.)	Avengers Team Wins; Each of the Avengers Team member received a golden shield. As penalty, Jee Seok-jin was hit on the forehead by Lee Kyung-kyu.
318	September 25, 2016 (September 13, 2016)	No guests	Fradia (Jamwon-dong, Seocho District, Seoul)	No teams		Make a 3-minute video based on the theme chosen and aim to get the most views	Kim Jong-kook Wins; Kim Jong-kook received a special advantage for the next race [see ep 319].
319 (Note: Special appearance by Lee Sun-bin.)	September 25, 2016 (September 13, 2016)	No guests	Fradia (Jamwon-dong, Seocho District, Seoul)	No teams		Make a 3-minute video based on the theme chosen and aim to get the most views	Kim Jong-kook Wins; Kim Jong-kook received a special advantage for the next race [see ep 319].
319	October 2, 2016 (September 27, 2016)	Chae Soo-bin Cho Jae-hyun Jae-suk's hunters: Dino; Hee-chun; In-haeng; Jae-yong; Ooon; Yoon-dong (HALO); Hong Yoon-hwa; Hye-yeon; Sally; So-yee (Gugudan); Jang Hong-je; Jang Jae-young; Kang Jae-joon; Kim Min-ki; Kim Sung-ki; Lee Soo-han; Maeng Seung-ji; Oh Bok-nam; Son Min-hyuk; Gary's hunters: Buffy; Dae-won; Heo-jun; H.O; Lee-geon; Moos (Madtown); Hana; Mimi (Gugudan); Joon-hyeon; Noah; Pabi (ALL-STAR); Kim Kyung-jin; Haha's hunters: Hyung-won; I.M; Ki-hyun; Min-hyuk; Won-ho (Monsta X); M.TySON; Ma Ah-sung; Seung-jun (KNK); Zizo; Seok-jin's hunters: Chan-yong; Hyuk-jin; Jong-hwan; Min-woo; Rok-hyun (100%); Chang-sun; Cory; Hong-seob; Hui; Jeong-uk; Jin-hong; Ki-su (24K); Da-hye; Hae-ryung; Kang Hye-yeon; U-Ji (Bestie); Hyun-kyung; Kang-min; Kyle; Milo; Minsung; Seung-hwan; Yoon-sung (Romeo); Hee-jun; In-seong; Ji-hun; You-jin (KNK); Jong-kook's hunters: Hyuk (VIXX); Ken (VIXX); Ravi (VIXX); Joo-Heon (Monsta X); Shownu (Monsta X); Kim Chang-ryeol; Lee Ha-neul (DJ Doc); Kwang-soo's hunters: FeelDog; Jude; Rae-hwan; Sung-hak (Big Star); Hae-bin; Na-young (Gugudan); Sang-ho; Sang-il; Se-bin; Su-hyun; Tae-woong; Woo-seong (Snuper); Ji-hyo's hunters: A-Tom; B-Joo; Han-sol; Ho-joon; Nakta; P-Goon; Xero; Yano (Topp Dogg); Lee Dong-yeob; Lee Eun-hyung; Lee Ho-chan	Yeouido Park (Yeouido-dong, Yeongdeungpo District, Seoul)	Running Man Team (Yoo Jae-suk, Gary, Haha, Jee Seok-jin, Kim Jong-kook, Lee Kwang-soo, Song Ji-hyo)	Blackmon Team (Chae Soo-bin, Cho Jae-hyun)	Running Man Team mission: Protect their nametags from hunters for 200 minutes and find Blackmon Team member with $10 name tag Running Man hunters: Find and eliminate their assigned Running Man Team members Blackmon Team mission: Avoid being caught by Running Man Team and fool them to choose a member with $0 name tag (Note: Blackmon Team was given other hidden missions, each success allows the Blackmon Team to send the location of Running Man Team members to their hunters for 10 minutes.)	Blackmon Team Wins; Blackmon Team received $310 and all 102 hunters received merchandise gifts.
320 (Note: Special appearance by Lee Dong-hwi, Skull through the phone.)	October 9, 2016 (October 3, 2016)	Jo Yoon-hee Lee Joon Lim Ji-yeon Yoo Hae-jin	National Hangeul Museum (Seobinggo-ro, Yongsan District, Seoul)	Blue Team (Yoo Jae-suk, Lee Kwang-soo, Lee Joon, Yoo Hae-jin); Red Team (Kim Jong-kook, Song Ji-hyo, Jo Yoon-hee, Lim Ji-yeon); Green Team (Gary, Haha, Jee Seok-jin)		Eliminate all the consonants of opponents' name tag, collect all 5 bags and open the chest	Blue Team Wins
321 (Note: Special appearance by Do Kwang-rok.)	October 16, 2016 (October 4, 2016)	Lee Kyu-han Park Na-rae Park Soo-hong Solbin (Laboum) Yang Se-chan	TBD	Red Team (Yoo Jae-suk, Gary, Park Soo-hong); Blue Team (Haha, Lee Kyu-han, Solbin); Green Team (Jee Seok-jin, Lee Kwang-soo, Yang Se-chan); Orange Team (Kim Jong-kook, Song Ji-hyo, Park Na-rae)		Find your own lock combination to unlock the luggage and the team which has the least amount of number on the dice will have a penalty	Green Team Wins; Lee Kyu-han was chosen to wear the suit they are wearing after filming until reaching home as a penalty.
322	October 23, 2016 (October 10, 2016)	Kang Min-kyung (Davichi) Park Mi-sun Son Yeon-jae Ye Ji-won Yura (Girl's Day)	TBD	Men's Team (Gary, Haha, Jee Seok-jin, Kim Jong-kook, Lee Kwang Soo, Park Mi-sun); Women's Team (Yoo Jae-suk, Song Ji Hyo, Kang Min-kyung, Son Yeon-jae, Yura, Ye Ji-won)	Men's Spy Team (Yoo Jae-suk, Kang Min-kyung); Women's Spy Team (Haha, Park Mi-sun)	Defeat the other team	Men's Team Wins; Yoo Jae-suk received a gold medal for succeeding as a spy. Men's Team received a set of stationery, except Park Mi-sun and Haha. Kang Min-kyung was punished by treating everyone for dinner due to her betrayal.
323	October 30, 2016 (October 17, 2016)	Choi Min-ho (Shinee) Jang Do-yeon Kim Jun-hyun Seo Ji-hye Yang Se-chan	SBS Tanhyeon-dong Production Center (Ilsanseo District, Goyang, Gyeonggi Province)	Blue Team (Yoo Jae-suk, Seo Ji-hye); Black Team (Gary, Choi Min-ho); Grey Team (Haha, Kim Jun-hyun); Brown Team (Jee Seok-jin, Yang Se-chan); White Team (Kim Jong-kook, Jang Do-yeon); Pink Team (Lee Kwang-soo, Song Ji-hyo)		Avoid penalty by securing two "GOLD" briefcases (Note: The race continuous until four teams manage to secure two "GOLD" briefcases.)	Black, White, Pink, Grey and Blue Team Wins; Blue Team managed to secure a "PASS" briefcase from the Brown Team and the latter received the penalty.
324 (Note: Gary's last episode as a member.) (Note: Special appearance by massage therapist Kim Hyung-joon.)	November 6, 2016 (October 31, 2016)	No guests	TBA	Memory Hunter Team (Yoo Jae-suk, Haha, Jee Seok-jin, Kim Jong-kook, Lee Kwang-soo, Song Ji-hyo); Chasing Team (Gary)		Collect a total of 77,000 km to earn specified prize for Gary; Memory Hunter Team mission: Steal items from Gary's studio without him noticing to avoid huge penalty	Everyone Wins; Gary received a Running Man Set for completing the mission in the 8th try and parting gifts from the other members.
325	November 13, 2016 (November 7, 2016)	Gary (Leessang)	TBA	No teams		Complete all missions within 6 hours	Everyone Wins
326	November 20, 2016 (November 8, 2016)	Eun Ji-won Jang Su-won Kang Sung-hoon Kim Jae-duc Lee Jai-jin (Sechs Kies) Hwang Woo-seul-hye	TBA	Limbo With My Lady, Mouth Gag Speed Quiz, Pillow Fight & The Servants' Drawings: Lady Ji-hyo Team (Song Ji-hyo, Eun Ji-won, Jang Su-won, Kang Sung-hoon, Kim Jae-duc, Lee Jai-jin); Lady Woo-seul-hye Team (Hwang Woo-seul-hye, Yoo Jae-suk, Haha, Jee Seok-jin, Kim Jong-kook, Lee Kwang-soo) Toy Hammer With My Lady: Lady Ji-hyo Team (Song Ji-hyo, Yoo Jae-suk, Eun Ji-won, Kim Jae-duc, Lee Jai-jin, Lee Kwang-soo); Lady Woo-seul-hye Team (Hwang Woo-seul-hye, Haha, Jee Seok-jin, Kim Jong-kook, Jang Su-won, Kang Sung-hoon)	Food Thief (Jang Su-won)	Avoid having the "food thief" as part of the team	Lady Ji-hyo Team Wins; Lady Ji-hyo Team received sacks of Icheon rice. Jang Su-won received a golden rice bowl and 100 sacks of rice were donated under his name for completing the hidden mission.
327	November 27, 2016 (November 14, 2016)	D.O. (Exo) Jo Jung-suk	Seomun Market (Jung District, Daegu)	Yoo Jae-suk & Jo Jung-suk; Haha & Song Ji-hyo; Jee Seok-jin & Kim Jong-kook; Lee Kwang-soo & D.O.		Avoid the penalty cards	Yoo Jae-suk & Jo Jung-suk, Jee Seok-jin & Kim Jong-kook, Lee Kwang-soo & D.O. Wins; Haha & Song Ji-hyo pay for all of the food the staff ate with their own money.
328	December 4, 2016 (November 15, 2016)	Nayeon Jeongyeon Momo Sana Jihyo Mina Dahyun Chaeyoung Tzuyu (Twice)	Let's Run Park Busan – Gyeongnam (Garak-daero, Gangseo District, Busan)	Black Team (Yoo Jae-suk, Jee Seok-jin, Jeongyeon, Momo, Nayeon); Gray Team (Kim Jong-kook, Song Ji-hyo, Chae-young, Mina, Tzuyu); Pink Team (Haha, Lee Kwang-soo, Da-hyun, Jihyo, Sana)		Get the highest number of candies hold	Gray Team Wins; Gray Team won a total of 8 prizes: Portable massager, giant octopus, dried squids, anchovy set, Eonyang bulgogi set, Gijang seaweed, Busan fish cakes and octopus-flavoured snacks.
329	December 11, 2016 (November 28, 2016)	No guests	Nambu Market (Wansan District, Jeonju, North Jeolla Province)	No teams		Earn R coins to win prizes	Pink Team Wins; Each member of Pink Team won dried laver gift set.
330	December 18, 2016 (November 28, 2016)	Jisoo Jennie Rosé Lisa (Blackpink)	Jeonju Dongheon (Wansan District, Jeonju, North Jeolla Province)	Black Team (Yoo Jae-suk, Jee Seok-jin, Lee Kwang-soo, Jisoo, Lisa); Pink Team (Haha, Kim Jong-kook, Song Ji-hyo, Jennie, Rosé)		Earn R coins to win prizes	Pink Team Wins; Each member of Pink Team won dried laver gift set.
331 (Note: Christmas Special.) (Note: Kim So-hyun acted as a host and did not participate in the race.)	December 25, 2016 (December 5, 2016)	Kim So-hyun	SBS Prism Tower (Sangam-dong, Mapo District, Seoul)	No teams		Win missions to raise the thermometer up to 100 °C and complete all five bullying pranks to avoid penalty	Yoo Jae-suk, Kim Jong-kook and Lee Kwang-soo Wins; Donations were made under their names. Jee Seok-jin received the penalty from the lottery draw.

== Ratings ==
- Ratings listed below are the individual corner ratings of Running Man. (Note: Individual corner ratings do not include commercial time, which regular ratings include.)

Ep. #	Original Airdate	TNmS Ratings	Naver Ratings
Ep. #	Original Airdate	Nationwide	
280	January 3, 2016	5.4%	6.3%
281	January 10, 2016	6.0%	6.6%
282	January 17, 2016	6.4%	6.7%
283	January 24, 2016	6.2%	7.2%
284	January 31, 2016	6.5%	5.6%
285	February 7, 2016	5.4%	5.9%
286	February 14, 2016	6.0%	5.5%
287	February 21, 2016	6.0%	6.1%
288	February 28, 2016	6.5%	7.4%
289	March 6, 2016	7.1%	7.5%
290	March 13, 2016	5.1%	5.6%
291	March 20, 2016	6.4%	6.4%
292	March 27, 2016	5.5%	5.4%
293	April 3, 2016	6.8%	8.0%
294	April 10, 2016	5.0%	4.9%
295	April 17, 2016	7.0%	7.4%
296	April 24, 2016	8.6%	8.4%
297	May 1, 2016	9.3%	9.1%
298	May 8, 2016	7.9%	7.8%
299	May 15, 2016	8.0%	9.1%
300	May 22, 2016	7.6%	6.8%
301	May 29, 2016	7.1%	7.7%
302	June 5, 2016	6.2%	6.8%
303	June 12, 2016	6.6%	6.8%
304	June 19, 2016	7.4%	7.0%
305	June 26, 2016	6.3%	7.4%
306	July 3, 2016	6.6%	7.2%
307	July 10, 2016	7.4%	7.4%
308	July 17, 2016	6.7%	7.8%
309	July 24, 2016	7.2%	7.1%
310	July 31, 2016	7.5%	6.8%
311	August 7, 2016	5.9%	5.3%
312	August 14, 2016	5.9%	5.7%
313	August 21, 2016	5.9%	5.7%
314	August 28, 2016	5.9%	5.5%
315	September 4, 2016	7.3%	6.1%
316	September 11, 2016	7.1%	6.7%
317	September 18, 2016	6.9%	7.0%
318	September 25, 2016	7.5%	6.8%
319	October 2, 2016	6.5%	6.2%
320	October 9, 2016	6.5%	7.2%
321	October 16, 2016	6.3%	6.5%
322	October 23, 2016	7.1%	7.5%
323	October 30, 2016	6.2%	6.4%
324	November 6, 2016	6.8%	6.7%
325	November 13, 2016	7.1%	6.2%
326	November 20, 2016	6.3%	6.2%
327	November 27, 2016	7.0%	6.7%
328	December 4, 2016	7.9%	6.2%
329	December 11, 2016	7.3%	6.6%
330	December 18, 2016	6.3%	5.9%
331	December 25, 2016	5.5%	5.3%
