= List of Running Man episodes (2017) =

- No. of episodes: 52

Release
- Original network: SBS
- Original release: January 1 – December 31, 2017

Season chronology
- ← Previous; 2016 Next → 2018

This is a list of episodes of the South Korean variety show Running Man in 2017. The show airs on SBS as part of their Good Night lineup.

== Episodes ==
List of episodes (332–383)
Ep.	Airdate (Filming date)	Guest(s)	Landmark	Teams		Mission	Results
332 (Note: New Year's Special.) (Note: Special appearance by announcer Kim Hwan and fortune teller Park Sung-joon.)	January 1, 2017 (December 25, 2016)	No guests	SBS Broadcasting Center (Mok-dong, Yangcheon District, Seoul)	No teams		Earn running balls to determine the first and second runners for Member's Week by water bomb	Yoo Jae-suk, Haha, Ji Suk-jin, Lee Kwang-soo Wins; Song Ji-hyo and Kim Jong-kook got water bombed and were picked as the 1st and 2nd runners respectively.
333 (Note: Member's Week Special.) (Note: Song Ji-hyo was exempted from the punishment.)	January 8, 2017 (January 2, 2017)	No guests	Gangwon Province (Pyeongchang)	No teams		"Song Ji-hyo's Week"; Complete various missions to reduce the number of members that will get soaked in an ice water pond	Ji Suk-jin, Kim Jong-kook, Lee Kwang-soo, Song Ji-hyo Wins; Haha and Yoo Jae-suk were chosen to go into the ice water pond.
334 (Note: Special appearance by Jung So-young (Kim Jong-kook's date) and Kim Jong-myung (Kim Jong-kook's brother).)	January 15, 2017 (January 3, 2017)	No guests	Han River Ferry Cruise (Yeouidong-ro, Yeongdeungpo District, Seoul)	No teams		"Kim Jong-kook's Week"; Complete various missions to make Kim Jong-kook's date with Jung So-young as romantic as possible	Everyone Wins; Kim Jong-kook was accepted by Jung So-young.
335 (Note: Special appearance by Ryu Soo-jung (Ji Suk-jin's wife).)	January 22, 2017 (January 16, 2017)	No guests	Hwang-je Wedding Town (Yeoju-eup, Yeoju-gun, Gyeonggi Province)	No teams		"Ji Suk-jin's Week"; Escape from prison to attend Ji Suk-jin's wedding party on time	Everyone Wins; Ji Suk-jin and his wife renewed their wedding vows.
336	January 29, 2017 (January 17, 2017)	Gary (Leessang)	SBS Tanhyeon-dong Production Center (Ilsanseo District, Goyang, Gyeonggi Province)	No teams		"Gary's Week"; Prevent this week's host from winning to avoid punishment and defeat the other members	Lee Kwang-soo Wins; Lee Kwang-soo was awarded an "R" trophy.
337 (Note: Special appearance by comedian Jung Sung-ho.)	February 5, 2017 (January 23, 2017)	No guests	Inje Naerincheon (Stream) Bungee Jumping (Inje-gup, Inje County, Gangwon Province)	Haha's Team (Haha, Yoo Jae-suk, Ji Suk-jin, Song Ji-hyo)	Loser Team (Kim Jong-kook, Lee Kwang-soo)	"Haha's Week"; Prevent Haha from completing the final mission	Everyone Wins; Haha received congratulatory gifts given by members and staff for his soon-to-be-born son.
338 (Note: Special appearances by Irene, Seulgi, Wendy, and Yeri (Red Velvet) in one of the missions. Joy was absent due to scheduling conflicts with drama filming.)	February 12, 2017 (February 6, 2017)	No guests	Songpa Park Habio (Munjeong-dong, Songpa District, Seoul)	Culprit Team (Yoo Jae-suk, Lee Kwang-soo)	Sauna Team (Haha, Ji Suk-jin, Kim Jong-kook, Song Ji-hyo)	Find the culprits who have stolen their clothes and eliminate them within 15 minutes	Yoo Jae-suk Wins; Song Ji-hyo received a trip to Southeast Asia. Haha and Kim Jong-kook got their clothes back for catching Lee Kwang-soo. Ji Suk-jin and Song Ji-hyo must accompany Lee Kwang-soo who must wear the rooster outfit in public as punishment.
339 (Note: Yoo Jae-suk acted as a host and did not participate in the race.)	February 19, 2017 (February 7, 2017)	Heo Kyung-hwan KCM Kim Won-hee Kim Yong-man Lee Chun-hee	Yeouido Hangang Park (Yeouidong-ro, Yeongdeungpo District, Seoul)	Running Man Team (Haha, Kim Jong-kook, Ji Suk-jin, Lee Kwang-soo, Song Ji-hyo)	Friends Team (Heo Kyung-hwan, KCM, Kim Won-hee, Kim Yong-man, Lee Chun-hee)	"Yoo Jae-suk's Week"; Defeat the other team on various missions to get 4 hints on the hidden prize location	Running Man Team Wins; Running Man Team received 6 gold "R" rings.
340 (Note: Special participation by Park Bo-young through the phone.)	February 26, 2017 (February 13, 2017)	No guests	SBS Broadcasting Center (Mok-dong, Yangcheon District, Seoul)	No teams		"Lee Kwang-soo's Week"; Complete all night trip courses in 6 hours and avoid being chosen to be water-bombed at the end	Haha, Ji Suk-jin, Kim Jong-kook, Lee Kwang-soo, Song Ji-hyo Wins; Yoo Jae-suk got water-bombed.
341 (Note: Special appearance by fortune teller Park Sung-joon.)	March 5, 2017 (February 20, 2017)	No guests	Mapo District (Seoul)	Running Man Team	Production Team	Earn the Running Balls	Running Man Team Wins; Running Man Team received a rooftop house which was previously used by one of the writers.
342 (Note: Special appearance by Cha Tae-hyun, Cheon Sung-moon (Song Ji-hyo's brother), Hong Seok-cheon, Jo Woo-jong, Kim Ji-min, Park Bo-gum, Park Jeong-min, Son Hyun-joo. Special appearance by Jo In-sung, Lee Dong-wook, Lee Jong-ho (Lee Kwang-soo's father), Song Joong-ki through the phone.)	March 19, 2017 (March 6, 2017)	No guests	Mapo District (Seoul)	No teams		Collect 16 items needed to decorate the rooftop house in 6 hours to avoid penalties	Everyone Wins
343	March 26, 2017 (March 14, 2017)	Choi Tae-joon Jeon So-min Kang Han-na Lee Se-young Park Jin-joo Umji (GFriend)	Gongju Hanok Village (Gwangwangdanji-gil, Gongju, South Chungcheong Province)	Couple Karaoke & Romantic Fortress Tour/Luxurious Tomb Tour: Yoo Jae-suk & Umji; Haha & Park Jin-joo; Ji Suk-jin & Kang Han-na; Kim Jong-kook & Lee Se-young; Lee Kwang-soo & Jeon So-min; Song Ji-hyo & Choi Tae-joon	Final Mission: Yoo Jae-suk & Umji; Haha & Park Jin-joo; Ji Suk-jin & Kang Han-na; Kim Jong-kook & Jeon So-min; Lee Kwang-soo & Lee Se-young; Song Ji-hyo & Choi Tae-joon	Retain as much money as possible until the end of the race and avoid taking the last place	Lee Kwang-soo & Lee Se-young Wins; Lee Kwang-soo and Lee Se-young received a couple "R" bracelet. Kim Jong-kook and Jeon So-min must go home by train.
344	April 2, 2017 (March 13, 2017)	Choi Min-yong Yoon Bo-mi (Apink)	SBS Broadcasting Center (Mok-dong, Yangcheon District, Seoul)	Food Guide: Jae-suk Team (Yoo Jae-suk, Ji Suk-jin, Song Ji-hyo, Choi Min-yong); Jong-kook Team (Kim Jong-kook, Haha, Lee Kwang-soo, Yoon Bo-mi)	Hide and Seek: Jae-suk Team (Yoo Jae-suk, Ji Suk-jin, Song Ji-hyo, Choi Min-yong, Yoon Bo-mi) (Note: Yoon Bo-mi transferred from Jong-kook Team due to the latter's defeat in the claw crane game.); Jong-kook Team (Kim Jong-kook, Haha, Lee Kwang-soo)	Obtain and protect as many ingredients out of 7 available ingredients	Jong-kook Team Wins; Kim Jong-kook, Haha and Lee Kwang-soo received the 7 ingredients.
345 (Note: Special appearance by Jeon So-min and Yang Se-chan on their membership interview. Special appearance by Yang Se-hyung.)	April 9, 2017 (March 20, 2017)	Han Jae-suk Sandara Park Yoon Park	Hyundai Motorstudio Goyang (Goyang, Gyeonggi Province)	Sandara Park Team (Sandara Park, Yoo Jae-suk, Kim Jong-kook); Han Jae-suk Team (Han Jae-suk, Haha, Song Ji-hyo); Yoon Park Team (Yoon Park, Ji Suk-jin, Lee Kwang-soo)		Complete the mission to win the final prize and avoid being in the last place Sandara Park Team mission: Pass through 6 different immigration checkpoints Han Jae-suk Team mission: Find hints on the location of the supercar Yoon Park Team mission: Eliminate other teams	Everyone Wins; Sandara Park Team received an overseas trip, Han Jae-suk Team received a ginseng set and Yoon Park Team received a gold "R" statue. Yoon Park got water-bombed. (Note: Yoon Park Team is the last team to complete their mission, which forced them to choose one teammate to receive the penalty.)
346 (Note: Jeon So-min and Yang Se-chan's first episode as members.)	April 16, 2017 (April 3, 2017)	No guests	SBS Prism Tower (Sangam-dong, Mapo District, Seoul)	Ice-bombed Challenge: New Members Team (Jeon So-min, Yang Se-chan); Running Man Team (Yoo Jae-suk, Haha, Ji Suk-jin, Kim Jong-kook, Lee Kwang-soo, Song Ji-hyo); Nonsense Quiz: Team 1 (Yoo Jae-suk, Lee Kwang-soo, Jeon So-min, Yang Se-chan); Team 2 (Haha, Ji Suk-jin, Kim Jong-kook, Song Ji-hyo); Dangerous Gathering: Gray Team (Yoo Jae-suk, Ji Suk-jin, Lee Kwang-soo, Jeon So-min); Dark Blue Team (Haha, Kim Jong-kook, Song Ji-hyo, Yang Se-chan)		Avoid scoring the lowest point from missions to avoid choosing Tourist Cards for dangerous overseas missions	Yoo Jae-suk, Haha, Ji Suk-jin, Kim Jong-kook, Lee Kwang-soo, Song Ji-hyo, Jeon So-min Wins; Yang Se-chan received a Couple Tourist Card and chose Haha as his partner.
347 (Note: Global Race Special.) (Note: Special appearance by massage therapist Kim Hyung-joon.)	April 23, 2017 (April 10, 2017)	Jang Do-yeon	Paradise City (Jung District, Incheon)	Osaka Team (Yoo Jae-suk, Ji Suk-jin, Jeon So-min); Taipei Team (Haha, Song Ji-hyo, Yang Se-chan); Jeju-do Team (Kim Jong-kook, Lee Kwang-soo, Jang Do-yeon)		Complete missions in the designated country and avoid getting the lightest souvenirs to avoid receiving the Tourist Card for dangerous overseas missions	Taipei Team & Jeju-do Team Wins; Yoo Jae-suk and Yang Se-chan received a Tourist Card. (Note: Yoo Jae-suk received the Tourist Card from losing the Osaka Team's final mission, while Yang Se-chan received the Tourist Card from getting the lightest souvenir.)
348	April 30, 2017 (April 10, 2017)	Jang Do-yeon	Paradise City (Jung District, Incheon)	Osaka Team (Yoo Jae-suk, Ji Suk-jin, Jeon So-min); Taipei Team (Haha, Song Ji-hyo, Yang Se-chan); Jeju-do Team (Kim Jong-kook, Lee Kwang-soo, Jang Do-yeon)		Complete missions in the designated country and avoid getting the lightest souvenirs to avoid receiving the Tourist Card for dangerous overseas missions	Taipei Team & Jeju-do Team Wins; Yoo Jae-suk and Yang Se-chan received a Tourist Card.
348	April 30, 2017 (April 17, 2017)	Hyo-rin (Sistar)	SBS Open Hall (Deungchon-dong, Gangseo District, Seoul)	Red Team (Yoo Jae-suk, Song Ji-hyo, Yang Se-chan); White Team (Haha, Lee Kwang-soo, Jeon So-min); Yellow Team (Ji Suk-jin, Kim Jong-kook, Hyo-rin)		Complete missions and secure two countries and avoid spending all the allowance	Red Team Wins; Kim Jong-kook received a Tourist Card for having the least amount of money.
349	April 30, 2017 (April 17, 2017)	Hyo-rin (Sistar)	SBS Open Hall (Deungchon-dong, Gangseo District, Seoul)	Red Team (Yoo Jae-suk, Song Ji-hyo, Yang Se-chan); White Team (Haha, Lee Kwang-soo, Jeon So-min); Yellow Team (Ji Suk-jin, Kim Jong-kook, Hyo-rin)		Complete missions and secure two countries and avoid spending all the allowance	Red Team Wins; Kim Jong-kook received a Tourist Card for having the least amount of money.
349	May 6, 2017 (April 24, 2017)	No guests	Jangsaengpo Port (Maeam-dong, Nam District, Ulsan)	Mission Team (Yoo Jae-suk, Haha, Ji Suk-jin, Lee Kwang-soo, Song Ji-hyo, Yang Se-chan)	Spy Team (Kim Jong-kook, Jeon So-min)	Complete missions to avoid receiving Tourist Cards and avoid receiving the most whale pins to avoid the penalty	Yoo Jae-suk, Haha, Kim Jong-kook, Song Ji-hyo, Jeon So-min, Yang Se-chan Wins; Ji Suk-jin received 3 Tourist Cards, Lee Kwang-soo received 2 Tourist Cards and both must go on a trip to see whales. (Note: Ji Suk-jin and Lee Kwang-soo managed to see a pod of whales and exempted from receiving more Tourist Cards.)
350	May 14, 2017 (April 25, 2017)	No guests	Gimhae Gaya Theme Park (Gaya thema-gil, Gimhae, South Gyeongsang Province)	Dangerous Wallet: No teams Dangerous 10 Seconds: Jae-suk Team (Yoo Jae-suk, Ji Suk-jin, Lee Kwang-soo, Yang Se-chan); Jong-kook Team (Kim Jong-kook, Haha, Song Ji-hyo, Jeon So-min); Your Dangerous Choice: Jae-suk Team (Yoo Jae-suk, Lee Kwang-soo, Song Ji-hyo, Jeon So-min); Jong-kook Team (Kim Jong-kook, Haha, Ji Suk-jin, Yang Se-chan); Irrelevant Answers & Dangerous Shoe Throw: No teams		Complete missions to collect and retain as much money as possible for the final mission and to avoid receiving Tourist Cards (Note: The final mission is to use the money to purchase Tourist Cards and reflecting cards.)	Yoo Jae-suk Wins; Yoo Jae-suk, Haha, Ji Suk-jin, Lee Kwang-soo, Jeon So-min and Yang Se-chan must go to Japan for the dangerous mission. (Note: Yoo Jae-suk received 4 Tourist Cards, Haha received 2 Tourist Cards, Kim Jong-kook received 1 Tourist Cards, Lee Kwang-soo received 1 Tourist Cards, Jeon So-min received 3 Tourist Cards.)
351 (Note: Special appearances by Ilya Belyakov, Isijanchan Aengkeubayaseu Gallang and Yang Se-hyung.)	May 21, 2017 (April 25, May 8 & 14-15, 2017)	No guests	Gimhae Gaya Theme Park (Gaya thema-gil, Gimhae, South Gyeongsang Province)	Dangerous Wallet: No teams Dangerous 10 Seconds: Jae-suk Team (Yoo Jae-suk, Ji Suk-jin, Lee Kwang-soo, Yang Se-chan); Jong-kook Team (Kim Jong-kook, Haha, Song Ji-hyo, Jeon So-min); Your Dangerous Choice: Jae-suk Team (Yoo Jae-suk, Lee Kwang-soo, Song Ji-hyo, Jeon So-min); Jong-kook Team (Kim Jong-kook, Haha, Ji Suk-jin, Yang Se-chan); Irrelevant Answers & Dangerous Shoe Throw: No teams		Complete missions to collect and retain as much money as possible for the final mission and to avoid receiving Tourist Cards	Yoo Jae-suk Wins; Yoo Jae-suk, Haha, Ji Suk-jin, Lee Kwang-soo, Jeon So-min and Yang Se-chan must go to Japan for the dangerous mission.
351	May 21, 2017 (April 25, May 8 & 14-15, 2017)	No guests	Gorkhi-Terelj National Park (Mongolia); Russky Island (Vladivostok, Primorsky Krai, Russia)	Mongolia Team (Song Ji-hyo, Yoo Jae-suk, Ji Suk-jin, Jeon So-min); Russia Team (Kim Jong-kook, Haha, Lee Kwang-soo, Yang Se-chan)		Mongolia Team mission: Meet a descendant of Genghis Khan and milk 4L of sheep's milk Russia Team mission: Catch a king crab and 10 different types of fish	No Winners; Kim Jong-kook chose Haha to be exempted from the dangerous mission in Japan. (Note: Russia Team managed to complete the mission, except catching a king crab. Instead, Russia Team caught an Asian shore crab and compromised, which allows Kim Jong-kook to exempt one teammate.)
352 (Note: Special appearance by Lee Chan-hyuk (AKMU) through the phone.)	May 28, 2017 (May 14–15, 2017)	No guests	Gorkhi-Terelj National Park (Mongolia); Russky Island (Vladivostok, Primorsky Krai, Russia)	Mongolia Team (Song Ji-hyo, Yoo Jae-suk, Ji Suk-jin, Jeon So-min); Russia Team (Kim Jong-kook, Haha, Lee Kwang-soo, Yang Se-chan)		Mongolia Team mission: Meet a descendant of Genghis Khan and milk 4L of sheep's milk Russia Team mission: Catch a king crab and 10 different types of fish	No Winners; Kim Jong-kook chose Haha to be exempted from the dangerous mission in Japan.
353	June 4, 2017 (May 14–15 & 29, 2017)	No guests	Gorkhi-Terelj National Park (Mongolia); Russky Island (Vladivostok, Primorsky Krai, Russia)	Mongolia Team (Song Ji-hyo, Yoo Jae-suk, Ji Suk-jin, Jeon So-min); Russia Team (Kim Jong-kook, Haha, Lee Kwang-soo, Yang Se-chan)		Mongolia Team mission: Meet a descendant of Genghis Khan and milk 4L of sheep's milk Russia Team mission: Catch a king crab and 10 different types of fish	No Winners; Kim Jong-kook chose Haha to be exempted from the dangerous mission in Japan.
353	June 4, 2017 (May 14–15 & 29, 2017)	No guests	Fuji-Q Highland (Fujiyoshida-shi, Yamanashi-ken, Japan)	Blue Team (Yoo Jae-suk, Ji Suk-jin, Lee Kwang-soo, Jeon So-min, Yang Se-chan); Yellow Team (Kim Jong-kook, Haha, Song Ji-hyo)		Blue Team mission: Find your name tag and escape the labyrinth (Note: Beforehand, Blue Team must complete missions to reduce the chance of completing the dangerous mission alone.); Yellow Team mission: Spend money in Yokohama to add the number of ghosts for Blue Team	Everyone Wins
354	June 11, 2017 (May 29, 2017)	No guests	Fuji-Q Highland (Fujiyoshida-shi, Yamanashi-ken, Japan)	Blue Team (Yoo Jae-suk, Ji Suk-jin, Lee Kwang-soo, Jeon So-min, Yang Se-chan); Yellow Team (Kim Jong-kook, Haha, Song Ji-hyo)		Blue Team mission: Find your name tag and escape the labyrinth Yellow Team mission: Spend money in Yokohama to add the number of ghosts for Blue Team	Everyone Wins
355 (Note: 1% People's Recommendation Special.) (Note: Special appearance by Kenichi Ito.)	June 18, 2017 (May 29–30, 2017)	Jung Hye-sung	Narita International Airport (Narita-shi, Chiba-ken, Japan)	White Team (Yoo Jae-suk, Haha, Jeon So-min); Orange Team (Kim Jong-kook, Lee Kwang-soo, Jung Hye-sung); Blue Team (Ji Suk-jin, Song Ji-hyo, Yang Se-chan)		Find no.1 places, complete the missions and obtain as many stamps to avoid receiving I-Go Stickers (Note: A dice must be rolled by the winner to decide who would receive the I-Go Stickers.)	White Team Wins; Haha and Jeon So-min received an I-Go Sticker.
356 (Note: Special appearance by Yang Se-hyung.)	June 25, 2017 (June 5 & 12, 2017)	No guests	The Coin Pop (Dongseon-dong, Seongbuk District, Seoul)	No teams		Complete missions by being discordance with other members to retain as much money as possible and avoid receiving I-Go Stickers	Song Ji-hyo Wins; Ji Suk-jin received an I-Go Sticker.
356	June 25, 2017 (June 5 & 12, 2017)	Hong Jin-young Lee Sun-bin Lee Tae-hwan (5urprise) Oh Ha-young (Apink) Son Na-eun (Apink) Son Yeo-eun	Blue One Water Park (Cheongun-dong, Gyeongju, North Gyeongsang Province)	Yoo Jae-suk & Son Yeo-eun; Haha & Jeon So-min; Ji Suk-jin & Oh Ha-young; Kim Jong-kook & Hong Jin-young; Lee Kwang-soo & Lee Sun-bin; Song Ji-hyo & Lee Tae-hwan; Yang Se-chan & Son Na-eun		Collect and retain as much money as possible to avoid receiving I-Go Stickers	Song Ji-hyo & Lee Tae-hwan Wins; Song Ji-hyo and Lee Tae-hwan received a pair of golden "R" rings. Haha received an I-Go Sticker, and he supposed to pick Lee Kwang soo for their week as penalty
357	July 2, 2017 (June 12, 2017)	Hong Jin-young Lee Sun-bin Lee Tae-hwan (5urprise) Oh Ha-young (Apink) Son Na-eun (Apink) Son Yeo-eun	Blue One Water Park (Cheongun-dong, Gyeongju, North Gyeongsang Province)	Yoo Jae-suk & Son Yeo-eun; Haha & Jeon So-min; Ji Suk-jin & Oh Ha-young; Kim Jong-kook & Hong Jin-young; Lee Kwang-soo & Lee Sun-bin; Song Ji-hyo & Lee Tae-hwan; Yang Se-chan & Son Na-eun		Collect and retain as much money as possible to avoid receiving I-Go Stickers	Song Ji-hyo & Lee Tae-hwan Wins; Song Ji-hyo and Lee Tae-hwan received a pair of golden "R" rings. Haha received an I-Go Sticker, and he supposed to pick Lee Kwang soo for their week as penalty
358	July 9, 2017 (June 26, 2017)	No guests	Dongduk Women's University Centennial Memorial Hall (Hwarang-ro, Seongbuk District, Seoul)	Sheriff (Yang Se-chan); Civilians Team (Haha, Ji Suk-jin, Lee Kwang-soo, Song Ji-hyo, Jeon So-min)	Thieves Team (Yoo Jae-suk, Kim Jong-kook)	Identify and eliminate the thieves before they eliminate the "sheriff"	Thieves Team Wins; Ji Suk-jin and Jeon So-min received an I-Go Sticker.
359	July 16, 2017 (July 3, 2017)	No guests	SBS Tanhyeon-dong Production Center (Ilsanseo District, Goyang, Gyeonggi Province)	Dice Go, Stop: White Team (Yoo Jae-suk, Ji Suk-jin, Lee Kwang-soo, Yang Se-chan); Black Team (Haha, Kim Jong-kook, Song Ji-hyo, Jeon So-min); Jukebox Go, Stop: White Team (Yoo Jae-suk, Ji Suk-jin, Kim Jong-kook, Yang Se-chan); Black Team (Haha, Lee Kwang-soo, Song Ji-hyo, Jeon So-min); Life-Changing Name Tag Elimination: White Team (Yoo Jae-suk, Kim Jong-kook, Lee Kwang-soo, Yang Se-chan); Black Team (Haha, Ji Suk-jin, Song Ji-hyo, Jeon So-min); Final Team: Blue Team (Yoo Jae-suk, Ji Suk-jin, Kim Jong-kook, Song Ji-hyo); Red Team (Haha, Lee Kwang-soo, Jeon So-min, Yang Se-chan)	Dud Men (Haha, Ji Suk-jin, Jeon So-min)	Join a team that has the fewest "dud men" to avoid receiving the dangerous missions	Blue Team Wins; Haha & Yang Se-chan and Jeon So-min & Lee Kwang-soo must go to the U.S. and Indonesia respectively for the dangerous mission.
360 (Note: 7th Anniversary Special.)	July 23, 2017 (July 11, 2017)	Cheon Sung-moon (Song Ji-hyo's brother) Jeon Wook-min (Jeon So-min's brother) Jo Se-ho Kim Jong-myung (Kim Jong-kook's brother) Kim Soo-young Park Geun-shik Son Na-eun (Apink) Tae Hang-ho	Royal Heritage Hotel-Chosunwangga (Yeoncheon-eup, Yeoncheon County, Gyeonggi Province)	Family Contest: Yoo Jae-suk & Jo Se-ho; Haha & Park Geun-shik; Ji Suk-jin & Kim Soo-young; Kim Jong-kook & Kim Jong-myung; Lee Kwang-soo & Tae Hang-ho; Song Ji-hyo & Cheon Sung-moon; Jeon So-min & Jeon Wook-min; Yang Se-chan & Son Na-eun	Final Mission: (Note: Before the final mission, the guests are given a chance to switch member upon completing a mission.); Yoo Jae-suk & Son Na-eun; Haha & Jo Se-ho; Ji Suk-jin & Kim Soo-young; Kim Jong-kook & Kim Jong-myung; Lee Kwang-soo & Tae Hang-ho; Song Ji-hyo & Cheon Sung-moon; Jeon So-min & Jeon Wook-min; Yang Se-chan & Park Geun-shik	Earn as much money as possible to avoid receiving the penalty	Ji Suk-jin & Kim Soo-young Wins; Song Ji-hyo, Cheon Sung-moon, Lee Kwang-soo and Tae Hang-ho got water-bombed, Kwang-soo's pants was dropped again after the radish game in front of the members and viewers.
361	July 30, 2017 (July 11, 2017)	Cheon Sung-moon (Song Ji-hyo's brother) Jeon Wook-min (Jeon So-min's brother) Jo Se-ho Kim Jong-myung (Kim Jong-kook's brother) Kim Soo-young Park Geun-shik Son Na-eun (Apink) Tae Hang-ho	Royal Heritage Hotel-Chosunwangga (Yeoncheon-eup, Yeoncheon County, Gyeonggi Province)	Family Contest: Yoo Jae-suk & Jo Se-ho; Haha & Park Geun-shik; Ji Suk-jin & Kim Soo-young; Kim Jong-kook & Kim Jong-myung; Lee Kwang-soo & Tae Hang-ho; Song Ji-hyo & Cheon Sung-moon; Jeon So-min & Jeon Wook-min; Yang Se-chan & Son Na-eun	Final Mission: Yoo Jae-suk & Son Na-eun; Haha & Jo Se-ho; Ji Suk-jin & Kim Soo-young; Kim Jong-kook & Kim Jong-myung; Lee Kwang-soo & Tae Hang-ho; Song Ji-hyo & Cheon Sung-moon; Jeon So-min & Jeon Wook-min; Yang Se-chan & Park Geun-shik	Earn as much money as possible to avoid receiving the penalty	Ji Suk-jin & Kim Soo-young Wins; Song Ji-hyo, Cheon Sung-moon, Lee Kwang-soo and Tae Hang-ho got water-bombed, Kwang-soo's pants was dropped again after the radish game in front of the members and viewers.
362 (Note: Summer Special.)	August 6, 2017 (July 31, 2017)	Kang Ha-neul Park Seo-joon	SBS Broadcasting Center (Mok-dong, Yangcheon District, Seoul)	Police Team (Kang Ha-neul, Park Seo-joon); Undercover Officer (Lee Kwang-soo)	Boss (Ji Suk-jin); Villain Team (Yoo Jae-suk, Haha, Kim Jong-kook, Song Ji-hyo, Jeon So-min, Yang Se-chan)	Identify and eliminate the "boss" while avoid eliminating the "undercover officer" before the villains find the briefcase and escape	Villain Team Wins; The prize money of ₩1,000,000 will be donated under the members' names, except for Lee Kwang-soo.
363 (Note: Seohyun (Girls' Generation) was absent due to scheduling conflicts with drama filming.)	August 13, 2017 (July 25, 2017)	Hyo-yeon Soo-young Sunny Tae-yeon Tiffany Yoona Yuri (Girls' Generation)	SBS Tanhyeon-dong Production Center (Ilsanseo District, Goyang, Gyeonggi Province)	Partners Team (Yoo Jae-suk & Song Ji-hyo, Haha & Sunny, Ji Suk-jin & Tiffany, Kim Jong-kook & Soo-young, Lee Kwang-soo & Hyo-yeon, Yang Se-chan & Yoona); Singles Team (Jeon So-min, Tae-yeon, Yuri)	Bad Girls (Jeon So-min, Soo-young, Yuri)	Identify the "bad girls" and without being their partners in the final mission to gain a voting right to expose them	Partners Team Wins; Kim Jong-kook has disqualified from the victory as he partnered with bad girl and got the water bombed penalty with them together.
364	August 20, 2017 (July 24, 2017)	No guests	Myongji College (Hongeun 2-dong, Seodaemun District, Seoul)	Human Team (Haha, Song Ji-hyo)	Ghost Team (Yoo Jae-suk, Ji Suk-jin, Kim Jong-kook, Lee Kwang-soo, Jeon So-min, Yang Se-chan)	Identify the other member of the Human Team and escape together at the end of the race	Ghost Team Wins; Human Team must find their name tags in the basement on their own.
365 (Note: Half and Half Special.) (Note: Special appearances by Jung Eun-ji (Apink), Kim Sook, Oh Ji-ho and Park Na-rae.)	August 27, 2017 (August 14, 2017)	No guests	SBS Prism Tower (Sangam-dong, Mapo District, Seoul)	Running Man Team	Production Team	Earn more than ₩200,000 at the end of the race (Note: The member who contribute the most money obtains the right to purchase name tags to increase or reduce the chance of being chosen for the delight or the dangerous missions.)	Production Team Wins; Yoo Jae-suk was selected to go to New Zealand for the dangerous mission.
366 (Note: So-you acted as a host and only participate as Ji Suk-jin's hidden partner.)	September 3, 2017 (August 21, 2017)	So-you	Hydrogen Energy Trial Event Zone (Hangang Park, Seoul)	Running Man Team	Production Team	Obtain as many blades as possible to exchange them for money	Haha Wins; Jeon So-min was selected to go to Bora Bora for the delight mission.
367	September 10, 2017 (August 28, 2017)	Baek Ji-young Hwang Seung-eon Jo Se-ho Kei (Lovelyz) Lee Elijah Solbi Sung Hoon Sunmi	SBS Broadcasting Center (Mok-dong, Yangcheon District, Seoul)	Yoo Jae-suk & Sunmi; Haha & Baek Ji-young; Ji Suk-jin & Solbi; Kim Jong-kook & Kei; Lee Kwang-soo & Hwang Seung-eon; Song Ji-hyo & Jo Se-ho; Jeon So-min & Sung Hoon; Yang Se-chan & Lee Elijah		Earn the most money at the end of the race	Haha & Baek Ji-young Wins; Yoo Jae-suk was selected to go to Rome for the delight mission. Baek Ji-young received 2 Korean Beef sets.
368	September 17, 2017 (August 28–29, 2017)	Baek Ji-young Hwang Seung-eon Jo Se-ho Kei (Lovelyz) Lee Elijah Solbi Sung Hoon Sunmi	SBS Broadcasting Center (Mok-dong, Yangcheon District, Seoul)	Yoo Jae-suk & Sunmi; Haha & Baek Ji-young; Ji Suk-jin & Solbi; Kim Jong-kook & Kei; Lee Kwang-soo & Hwang Seung-eon; Song Ji-hyo & Jo Se-ho; Jeon So-min & Sung Hoon; Yang Se-chan & Lee Elijah		Earn the most money at the end of the race	Haha & Baek Ji-young Wins; Yoo Jae-suk was selected to go to Rome for the delight mission. Baek Ji-young received 2 Korean Beef sets.
368	September 17, 2017 (August 28–29, 2017)	No guests	SBS Tanhyeon-dong Production Center (Ilsanseo District, Goyang, Gyeonggi Province)	Running Man Team	Designer (Lee Kwang-soo)	Earn more than ₩300,000 and identify the "designer" along with his hidden mission at the end of the race	Production Team Wins; Lee Kwang-soo was selected to go to Australia for the dangerous mission. Lee Kwang-soo was also chosen for the project's penalty and must complete the dangerous mission in Australia with another member.
369	September 24, 2017 (August 29 & September 3, 2017)	No guests	SBS Tanhyeon-dong Production Center (Ilsanseo District, Goyang, Gyeonggi Province)	Running Man Team	Designer (Lee Kwang-soo)	Earn more than ₩300,000 and identify the "designer" along with his hidden mission at the end of the race	Production Team Wins; Lee Kwang-soo was selected to go to Australia for the dangerous mission. Lee Kwang-soo was also chosen for the project's penalty and must complete the dangerous mission in Australia with another member.
369	September 24, 2017 (August 29 & September 3, 2017)	No guests	Cheongpung Land (Cheongpung-myeon, Jecheon, North Chungcheong Province)	No teams		Guess who is lying between Lee Kwang-soo and Jeon So-min to avoid receiving the penalty pin	Haha, Ji Suk-jin, Kim Jong-kook, Lee Kwang-soo, Song Ji-hyo and Jeon So-min Wins; Yoo Jae-suk and Yang Se-chan must perform a live broadcast during Chuseok holiday. Yoo Jae-suk got water-bombed.
370	October 1, 2017 (September 25, 2017) (Note: The filming date in Yogyakarta, Indonesia, for the 1% People's Recommendation Special's penalty took place from September 3–4, 2017.)	No guests	Cheongpung Land (Cheongpung-myeon, Jecheon, North Chungcheong Province)	No teams		Guess who is lying between Lee Kwang-soo and Jeon So-min to avoid receiving the penalty pin	Haha, Ji Suk-jin, Kim Jong-kook, Lee Kwang-soo, Song Ji-hyo and Jeon So-min Wins; Yoo Jae-suk and Yang Se-chan must perform a live broadcast during Chuseok holiday. Yoo Jae-suk got water-bombed.
371	October 8, 2017 (September 25 & October 8, 2017)	No guests	Cheongpung Land (Cheongpung-myeon, Jecheon, North Chungcheong Province)	No teams		Guess who is lying between Lee Kwang-soo and Jeon So-min to avoid receiving the penalty pin	Haha, Ji Suk-jin, Kim Jong-kook, Lee Kwang-soo, Song Ji-hyo and Jeon So-min Wins; Yoo Jae-suk and Yang Se-chan must perform a live broadcast during Chuseok holiday. Yoo Jae-suk got water-bombed.
372	October 15, 2017 (September 26, 2017)	Shin Sung-rok Yoon Bo-mi (Apink)	SBS Tanhyeon-dong Production Center (Ilsanseo District, Goyang, Gyeonggi Province)	Running Man Team	Lee Kwang-soo's assistant (Shin Sung-rok) (Note: Lee Kwang-soo pretended to be the 2nd assistant.)	Identify and eliminate Lee Kwang-soo's "assistant" to be exempted as Lee Kwang-soo's potential partner for the dangerous mission in Australia	Kim Jong-kook Wins; Kim Jong-kook was exempted from being chosen as Lee Kwang-soo's partner. Lee Kwang-soo chose Yoo Jae-suk to accompany him for the dangerous mission in Australia.
373	October 22, 2017 (October 2, 2017)	No guests	Café Valor (Baekbeom-ro, Bupyeong District, Incheon)	No teams		Visit 5 vacation spots with a budget of ₩1 million within 8 hours	Everyone Wins
374	October 29, 2017 (October 16, 2017)	Ha Yeon-soo Jo Se-ho Kang Daniel (Wanna One) Noh Sa-yeon	SBS Tanhyeon-dong Production Center (Ilsanseo District, Goyang, Gyeonggi Province)	Yoo-chen Gang (Yoo Jae-suk, Ji Suk-jin, Lee Kwang-soo, Noh Sa-yeon); Police Team (Haha, Kim Jong-kook, Yang Se-chan, Ha Yeon-soo); Mung-dol Gang (Song Ji-hyo, Jeon So-min, Jo Se-ho, Kang Daniel)		Obtain the Running Balls by opening the other teams' safebox	Noh Sa-yeon Wins ₩2.4 million will be donated under Noh Sa-yeon's name.
375	November 5, 2017 (October 16 & 17, 2017)	Ha Yeon-soo Jo Se-ho Kang Daniel (Wanna One) Noh Sa-yeon	SBS Tanhyeon-dong Production Center (Ilsanseo District, Goyang, Gyeonggi Province)	Yoo-chen Gang (Yoo Jae-suk, Ji Suk-jin, Lee Kwang-soo, Noh Sa-yeon); Police Team (Haha, Kim Jong-kook, Yang Se-chan, Ha Yeon-soo); Mung-dol Gang (Song Ji-hyo, Jeon So-min, Jo Se-ho, Kang Daniel)		Obtain the Running Balls by opening the other teams' safebox	Noh Sa-yeon Wins ₩2.4 million will be donated under Noh Sa-yeon's name.
375	November 5, 2017 (October 16 & 17, 2017)	No guests	Yeongjong Bridge Fortune Hill Rest Area (Gyeongseo-dong, Seo District, Incheon)	No teams		Retain your personal item to avoid the penalty	Haha, Ji Suk-jin, Kim Jong-kook, Song Ji-hyo, Jeon So-min, Yang Se-chan Wins; Yoo Jae-suk and Lee Kwang-soo got water-bombed twice.
376	November 12, 2017 (October 23, 2017)	Donghae Eun-hyuk Leeteuk Yesung (Super Junior) Irene Joy (Red Velvet)	Jincheon National Training Center (Gwanghyewon-myeon, Jincheon-gun, North Chungcheong Province)	Big Nose Team (Yoo Jae-suk, Ji Suk-jin, Lee Kwang-soo, Jeon So-min, Eun-hyuk, Leeteuk, Joy) (Note: Eun-hyuk was a spy for the Hare & Tortoise Team.)	Hare & Tortoise Team (Haha, Kim Jong-kook, Song Ji-hyo, Yang Se-chan, Donghae, Yesung, Irene) (Note: Haha was a spy for the Big Nose Team.)	Earn the most money at the end of the race	Hare & Tortoise Team Wins; Hare & Tortoise Team was able to have a chicken party.
377	November 19, 2017 (November 6, 2017)	Im Se-mi Kim Ji-min Kim Se-jeong (Gugudan) Ko Sung-hee	Incheon International Airport Terminal 2 (Jung District, Incheon, Seoul)	Yoo Jae-suk & Im Se-mi; Haha & Song Ji-hyo; Ji Suk-jin & Ko Sung-hee; Kim Jong-kook & Kim Ji-min; Lee Kwang-soo & Jeon So-min; Yang Se-chan & Kim Se-jeong	Youngest Daughters (Song Ji-hyo, Kim Se-jeong, Ko Sung-hee)	Identify and eliminate the higher-ranked teams and the "youngest daughter" before the latter eliminate everyone	Youngest Daughters Wins; Song Ji-hyo, Kim Se-jeong and Ko Sung-hee each received a gold airplane badge. Haha, Kim Jong-kook and Lee Kwang-soo must wear embarrassing outfits to the airport.
378	November 26, 2017 (November 11–14, 2017)	No guests	Crocosaurus Cove (Darwin, Northern Territory, Australia); Nevis Highwire Platform (Southern Alps, Queenstown, New Zealand)	Australia Team (Yoo Jae-suk, Ji Suk-jin, Lee Kwang-soo, Jeon So-min); New Zealand Team (Haha, Kim Jong-kook, Song Ji-hyo, Yang Se-chan)		Complete missions to be able to accept or refuse a chance card	Everyone Wins; Lee Kwang-soo is one of the members did not reject to go to the restaurant, while Ji Suk-jin, Yoo Jae-suk and Jeon So-min are the members reject to complete the mission considered as fail.
379	December 3, 2017 (November 11–14, 2017)	No guests	Crocosaurus Cove (Darwin, Northern Territory, Australia); Nevis Highwire Platform (Southern Alps, Queenstown, New Zealand)	Australia Team (Yoo Jae-suk, Ji Suk-jin, Lee Kwang-soo, Jeon So-min); New Zealand Team (Haha, Kim Jong-kook, Song Ji-hyo, Yang Se-chan)		Complete missions to be able to accept or refuse a chance card	Everyone Wins; Lee Kwang-soo is one of the members did not reject to go to the restaurant, while Ji Suk-jin, Yoo Jae-suk and Jeon So-min are the members reject to complete the mission considered as fail.
380	December 10, 2017 (November 21, 2017)	Kang Han-na Kyung Soo-jin	ASEAN Culture House (Jwa-dong, Haeundae District, Busan)	Red Team (Yoo Jae-suk, Ji Suk-jin, Lee Kwang-soo, Song Ji-hyo, Kang Han-na)	White Team (Haha, Kim Jong-kook, Jeon So-min, Yang Se-chan, Kyung Soo-jin)	Retain the most money or deposit more than the other team to avoid the penalty	Lee Kwang-soo Wins; Lee Kwang-soo received a sum of ₩200,000. Haha, Ji Suk-jin, Jeon So-min and Yang Se-chan got water-bombed.
381	December 17, 2017 (November 28, 2017)	Choi Gwi-hwa Go Bo-gyeol Heo Sung-tae Lee Sang-yeob	SBS Tanhyeon-dong Production Center (Ilsanseo District, Goyang, Gyeonggi Province)	Detective Team (Yoo Jae-suk); Witness (Heo Sung-tae); Civilian Team (Haha, Ji Suk-jin, Lee Kwang-soo, Song Ji-hyo, Jeon So-min, Yang Se-chan, Go Bo-gyeol, Lee Sang-yeob)	Villain Team (Kim Jong-kook, Choi Gwi-hwa) (Note: Choi Gwi-hwa pretended to be the 2nd detective.)	Protect the "witness" and eliminate the Villain Team	Villain Team Wins ₩3,000,000 was donated to charity under Choi Gwi-hwa's name.
382 (Note: Christmas Special.)	December 24, 2017 (December 18, 2017)	No guests	Gangwon Industrial High School (Chogu-dong, Donghae, Gangwon Province)	No teams		Become the only human and stand on the platform at dawn	Lee Kwang-soo Wins; Lee Kwang-soo received a box of sweet potatoes and a coffee maker.
383 (Note: Year-End Special.)	December 31, 2017 (December 11, 2017)	Eun Ji-won Jang Su-won Kang Sung-hoon Kim Jae-duc Lee Jai-jin (Sechs Kies) Lee Elijah So-you	Alpensia Resort (Pyeongchang County, Gangwon Province)	White Team (Yoo Jae-suk, Yang Se-chan, Eun Ji-won, Kang Sung-hoon, Lee Jai-jin); Black Team (Haha, Kim Jong-kook, Song Ji-hyo, Jeon So-min, Jang Su-won); Grey Team (Ji Suk-jin, Lee Kwang-soo, Kim Jae-duck, Lee Elijah, So-you)		Have the most fire stickers and the least ice stickers to avoid receiving the penalty	Lee Kwang-soo Wins; Lee Kwang-soo received ₩1,000,000. Lee Kwang-soo became first ever winner and loser, and chose Kim Jong-kook as partner for the water-bomb penalty in the next episode of 2018.

== Ratings ==
- Ratings listed below are the individual corner ratings of Running Man. (Note: Individual corner ratings do not include commercial time, which regular ratings include.)
- Note for TNmS ratings, the ones listed here is the higher ratings chosen amongst ratings for each episodes.

Ep. #	Original Airdate	TNmS Ratings	Naver Ratings
Ep. #	Original Airdate	Nationwide	
332	January 1, 2017	6.6%	6.6%
333	January 8, 2017	6.7%	7.5%
334	January 15, 2017	8.0%	7.8%
335	January 22, 2017	6.8%	6.6%
336	January 29, 2017	5.3%	4.9%
337	February 5, 2017	7.0%	6.8%
338	February 12, 2017	6.9%	6.8%
339	February 19, 2017	7.2%	6.4%
340	February 26, 2017	7.3%	7.4%
341	March 5, 2017	6.5%	6.2%
342	March 19, 2017	6.2%	5.5%
343	March 26, 2017	5.5%	5.2%
344	April 2, 2017	6.4%	5.1%
345	April 9, 2017	4.4%	3.4%
346	April 16, 2017	5.6%	5.4%
347	April 23, 2017	7.1%	6.4%
348	April 30, 2017	4.9%	5.2%
349	May 7, 2017	5.9%	6.3%
350	May 14, 2017	7.8%	6.6%
351	May 21, 2017	6.4%	5.9%
352	May 28, 2017	6.2%	6.2%
353	June 4, 2017	6.7%	6.1%
354	June 11, 2017	6.3%	5.9%
355	June 18, 2017	5.6%	6.2%
356	June 25, 2017	6.0%	6.2%
357	July 2, 2017	6.6%	6.9%
358	July 9, 2017	7.2%	6.1%
359	July 16, 2017	6.9%	6.6%
360	July 23, 2017	8.3%	8.0%
361	July 30, 2017	7.7%	5.4%
362	August 6, 2017	6.8%	5.5%
363	August 13, 2017	7.2%	7.0%
364	August 20, 2017	6.8%	6.6%
365	August 27, 2017	6.7%	6.1%
366	September 3, 2017	6.5%	7.7%
367	September 10, 2017	9.0%	7.9%
368	September 17, 2017	8.7%	8.2%
369	September 24, 2017	9.6%	8.7%
370	October 1, 2017	7.7%	8.3%
371	October 8, 2017	7.4%	7.9%
372	October 15, 2017	8.4%	8.8%
373	October 22, 2017	8.2%	8.8%
374	October 29, 2017	8.9%	8.2%
375	November 5, 2017	6.6%	6.9%
376	November 12, 2017	7.7%	7.7%
377	November 19, 2017	8.8%	8.7%
378	November 26, 2017	7.9%	8.6%
379	December 3, 2017	10.5%	10.3%
380	December 10, 2017	8.6%	9.4%
381	December 17, 2017	8.6%	9.4%
382	December 24, 2017	7.5%	8.5%
383	December 31, 2017	7.1%	6.8%
