= Yongma Land =

1980–2011 South Korean amusement park

- Interactive map of Yongma Land
- Location: Yongmasan, Jungnang District, South Korea
- Coordinates: 37.59441°N 127.10549°E
- Status: Defunct
- Opened: 1983
- Closed: 2011

- Yongma Land
- Hangul: 용마랜드
- Hanja: 龍馬랜드
- RR: Yongma raendeu
- MR: Yongma raendŭ

Yongma Land (Korean: 용마랜드) is a small abandoned amusement park in Yongmasan, Jungnang District, Seoul, South Korea. It operated from 1980 to 2011.

== History ==
Yongma Land opened in 1983 as a family-friendly amusement park. Yongma Land was a popular location for local families for the first decade after it opened. However, when Lotte World opened in 1989, people lost interest in the smaller Yongma Land. The park was renovated in 1995, with new attractions added. The park officially ceased operation in 2011 after the city revoked their license.

Rides in the park included a carousel, bumper cars, and an octopus-themed ride.

== Present Day ==
Though it is no longer operating as an amusement park, the area continues to attract about 50 to 60 visitors each day, such as urban explorers, cosplayers, photographers, and professionals in the video production industries. The current owner of the property allows visitors for a small fee. Money collected from visitor fees allows the owner to maintain arrested decay in the park.

Several television shows have been filmed at the park, including Cafe Minamdang, Heartless City, and Sisyphus: The Myth. K-pop groups and singers, including Crayon Pop, Dreamcatcher and Baek Ji-young, have used the park for music videos.
