= List of Running Man episodes (2019) =

- No. of episodes: 51

Release
- Original network: SBS
- Original release: January 6 – December 29, 2019

Season chronology
- ← Previous; 2018 Next → 2020

This is a list of episodes of the South Korean variety show Running Man in 2019. The show airs on SBS as part of their Good Sunday lineup.

== Episodes ==
List of episodes (433–483)
Ep.	Air date (Filming date)	Title	Guest(s)	Landmark	Teams		Mission	Results
433 (Note: New Year's RPG Project.) (Note: Special appearances by Jung Eun-ji, Kim Nam-joo, Oh Ha-young, Park Cho-rong, Son Na-eun, Yoon Bo-mi (Apink).)	January 6, 2019 (December 17, 2018)	Level Up Race (레벨업 레이스)	Apink	Daemyung Vivaldi Park Ski World (Seo-myeon, Hongcheon County, Gangwon Province)	No teams		New Year's RPG Project; Be the first to reach level 10 to end the project and receive an enormous prize Level up mission 1 Collect 8 ingredients to make Rice Cake soup in order to level up	Ji Suk-jin, Kim Jong-kook, Lee Kwang-soo and Jeon So-min Wins; Ji Suk-jin and Lee Kwang-soo were punished to wear pig costume and required to give out all the pig plushies to fulfill previous penalty [see ep 432]. Standings: Name / Level; Kim Jong-kook / 4; Lee Kwang-soo / 4; Jeon So-min / 3; Ji Suk-jin / 2; Song Ji-hyo / 2; Yoo Jae-suk / 1; Haha / 1; Yang Se-chan / 1
434 (Note: Special appearances by Chungha, Doyeon (Weki Meki), Kim Jong-kyu, Lee Gwan-hee, Marcus Foster, Park Chan-hee, Seunghoon, Seungyoon (WINNER), Yang Hee-jong and Yang Hong-seok.)	January 13, 2019 (January 7, 2019)	The Secret of The Clans (비밀사수 레이스)	No guests	SBS Prism Tower (Sangam-dong, Mapo District, Seoul)	Black Clan (Yoo Jae-suk, Haha); Grey Clan (Ji Suk-jin, Lee Kwang-soo); Green Clan (Kim Jong-kook, Jeon So-min); Purple Clan (Song Ji-hyo, Yang Se-chan)		New Year's RPG Project; Be the first to reach level 10 to end the project and receive an enormous prize Level up mission 2 Protect your clan member's secret till the end of the race	Black Clan Wins; Black Clan received ₩100,000. The secrets of Ji Suk-jin, Lee Kwang-soo, Song Ji-hyo and Jeon So-min got revealed. Ji Suk-jin and Lee Kwang-soo received the whipped cream penalty. Standings: Name / Level; Jeon So-min / 6; Haha / 4; Kim Jong-kook / 4; Lee Kwang-soo / 4; Song Ji-hyo / 3; Yoo Jae-suk / 2; Ji Suk-jin / 2; Yang Se-chan / 2
435	January 20, 2019 (January 8, 2019)	The Case of the Level Fabrication (레벨 위조 사건)	Gong Myung (5urprise); Jin Seon-kyu; Lee Dong-hwi; Lee Hanee; Ryu Seung-ryong	SBS Tanhyeon-dong Production Center (Ilsanseo District, Goyang, Gyeonggi Province)	Police Officer (Ryu Seung-ryong); Civilian Team (Haha, Ji Suk-jin, Kim Jong-kook, Song Ji-hyo, Jeon So-min, Yang Se-chan, Gong Myung, Jin Seon-kyu, Lee Dong-hwi)	Thieves (Yoo Jae-suk, Lee Kwang-soo); Forger (Lee Hanee)	New Year's RPG Project; Be the first to reach level 10 to end the project and receive an enormous prize Level up mission 3 Civilian Team and Police Officer: Identify and eliminate the thieves and the forger Thieves and Forger: Steal Haha, Kim Jong-kook, Jeon So-min and the Police Officer's pens to gain the rights and eliminate them	Police Officer and Civilian Team Wins; Ryu Seung-ryong, Gong Myung, Jin Seon-kyu and Lee Dong-hwi received a gold badge. Yoo Jae-suk and Lee Kwang-soo's level were reset to 0. Haha gained +2 levels for eliminating Yoo Jae-suk. Standings: Name / Level; Haha / 6; Jeon So-min / 6; Kim Jong-kook / 4; Song Ji-hyo / 3; Ji Suk-jin / 2; Yang Se-chan / 2; Yoo Jae-suk / 0; Lee Kwang-soo / 0
436	January 27, 2019 (January 21, 2019)	A Turn-around Companion (역전의 짝꿍)	Hong Jong-hyun; Jeong Yu-mi; Jimin; Mina (AOA); Lee Yoo-ri; Seungri (Big Bang)	Daemyung Vivaldi Park Ski World (Seo-myeon, Hongcheon County, Gangwon Province)	Dark Blue Team (Yoo Jae-suk, Jeong Yu-mi); Red Team (Haha, Mina); Brown Team (Ji Suk-jin, Seungri); Blue Team (Kim Jong-kook, Song Ji-hyo); Orange Team (Lee Kwang-soo, Lee Yoo-ri); Grey Team (Jeon So-min, Hong Jong-hyun); Purple Team (Yang Se-chan, Jimin)		New Year's RPG Project; Be the first to reach level 10 to end the project and receive an enormous prize Final mission Reach level 10 before the race ends or exchange your team levels for slots on the roulette wheel and get chosen.	Blue Team Wins; Blue Team received SBS company white paper commodity ticket. Standings: Name / Individual Level / Combined Team Level; Jeon So-min / 6 / 10; Haha / 6 / 9; Kim Jong-kook / 4 / 8; Song Ji-hyo / 4 / 8; Yang Se-chan / 2 / 7; Ji Suk-jin / 2 / 4; Lee Kwang-soo / 2 / 3; Yoo Jae-suk / 0 / 6
437 (Note: New Year's Special.)	February 3, 2019 (January 22, 2019)	Game of Thrones (왕좌의 게임)	Go Ara; Jung Il-woo; Kwon Yul; Park Hoon	Korea House (Pil-dong, Jung District, Seoul)	Weak Puppet King Team (Ji Suk-jin, Yoo Jae-suk, Kim Jong-kook, Go Ara, Kwon Yul); Crazy King Team (Jeon So-min, Lee Kwang-soo, Yang Se-chan, Park Hoon); Handsome King Team (Jung Il-woo, Haha, Song Ji-hyo)		Guess the real King and join their team	Weak Puppet King Team Wins; Crazy King Team and Handsome King Team got water bomb penalty.
438	February 10, 2019 (January 29, 2019)	The Commander vs The Ace (능력자 vs 에이스)	No guests	Alver Coffee Shop (Yeoksam-dong, Gangnam District, Seoul)	Ace Team (Song Ji-hyo, Yoo Jae-suk, Haha, Ji Suk-jin)	Commander Team (Kim Jong-kook, Lee Kwang-soo, Jeon So-min, Yang Se-chan)	Compete for slots on the roulette wheel and get chosen for a trip to Los Angeles (LA)	Ace Team Wins; Song Ji-hyo received a trip to LA and can choose 1 member from her team to accompany her.
439 (Note: Special appearance by Hong Jin-young.)	February 17, 2019 (February 11, 2019)	Protect the Bomb (폭탄을 지켜라)	No guests	Hangang Park (Han River, Banpo-dong, Seocho District, Seoul)	Red Team (Yoo Jae-suk, Ji Suk-jin, Lee Kwang-soo, Jeon So-min)	Green Team (Kim Jong-kook, Haha, Song Ji-hyo, Yang Se-chan)	Find the food item that cost under the given price to be given a chance to explode the opposing team's bomb	Red Team Wins; Haha was exempted from the punishment. Kim Jong-kook, Song Ji-hyo and Yang Se-chan got water slap on their faces as penalty.
440 (Note: 100th anniversary of March First Movement Special.)	February 24, 2019 (February 12, 2019)	The Great War of Money (위대한 쩐쟁)	No guests	Kim Koo Museum (Hyochang-dong, Yongsan District, Seoul)	Mission Team (Yoo Jae-suk, Ji Suk-jin, Lee Kwang-soo, Jeon So-min)	Chasing Team (Kim Jong-kook, Haha, Song Ji-hyo, Yang Se-chan)	Hide and avoid the Chasing Team for the remaining amount of duration to protect the money earned every minute	Kim Jong-kook Wins
441 (Note: Special appearances by Hwang Je-sung, Nam Chang-hee and Park Bo-young.)	March 3, 2019 (February 18, 2019)	The Honeybee's Judgment (꿀벌의 심판)	No guests	Seoul Museum Of History (Sajik-dong, Jongno District, Seoul)	Mission Team (Yoo Jae-suk, Haha, Ji Suk-jin, Kim Jong-kook, Song Ji-hyo)	Honey Bee Team (Lee Kwang-soo, Jeon So-min, Yang Se-chan)	Correctly identify and eliminate the whole Honey Bee Team within the time limit to avoid receiving a penalty	Honey Bee Team Wins; Yoo Jae-suk was chosen to get spanked three times by Honey Bee Team as penalty.
442	March 10, 2019 (February 25, 2019)	Mystery OT (미스터리 OT)	Han Da-gam; Hong Jin-young; Keum Sae-rok	Unknown	Freshmen Team (Yoo Jae-suk, Ji Suk-jin, Kim Jong-kook, Lee Kwang-soo, Song Ji-hyo, Jeon So-min, Yang Se-chan, Han Da-gam, Hong Jin-young, Keum Sae-rok)	Returning Student (Haha)	Correctly vote for the Returning Student in each round of games to accumulate prizes and avoid the penalty	Returning Student Wins; Yoo Jae-suk, Ji Suk-jin and Lee Kwang-soo received the water bomb penalty.
443 (Note: Special appearances by Choi Sung-min, Moon Se-yoon, Oh Chang-seok, Lee Sang-yeob and SF9.)	March 17, 2019 (February 26, 2019)	Unboxing Race (언박싱 레이스)	No guests	Unknown	Green Team (Yoo Jae-suk, Lee Kwang-soo); Yellow Team (Ji Suk-jin, Song Ji-hyo, Yang Se-chan); Red Team (Kim Jong-kook, Haha, Jeon So-min)		Search for cellphones in auctioned cardboard boxes to obtain hints on how to win the race	Green Team Wins; Yoo Jae-suk received a jumping rope and Lee Kwang-soo received a huge empty box.
444	March 24, 2019 (March 12, 2019)	Case Number 444 (사건번호 444)	No guests	Studio Art Views (Seongsu-dong, Seongdong District, Seoul)	Ji Suk-jin Team (Ji Suk-jin, Yoo Jae-suk, Kim Jong-kook, Lee Kwang-soo); Song Ji-hyo Team (Song Ji-hyo, Haha, Jeon So-min, Yang Se-chan)	Culprit (Fine Dust)	Search for clues and be the first to identify the Culprit and instructions on how to survive	Kim Jong-kook Wins; Kim Jong-kook received an air purifier. Yoo Jae-suk, Ji Suk-jin and Lee Kwang-soo was eliminated by the Culprit and received the water bomb penalty upon escaping.
445	March 31, 2019 (March 11, 2019)	Solo Battle (솔/로/대/첩)	Bona (Cosmic Girls); Jang Hee-jin; Kim Jae-young	Seokyeong University (Jeongneung-dong, Seongbuk District, Seoul)	Relationship Virgin (Yoo Jae-suk); Solo Brigade (Haha, Ji Suk-jin, Kim Jong-kook, Lee Kwang-soo, Song Ji-hyo, Yang Se-chan, Bona, Jang Hee-jin)	Secret Couple (Jeon So-min, Kim Jae-young)	Identify and eliminate the Secret Couple before they eliminate the Relationship Virgin or vote the Secret Couple out through 2 rounds of voting	Secret Couple Wins; Jeon So-min and Kim Jae-young each received a gold ring.
446 (Note: Jeon So-min's Birthday Special.)	April 7, 2019 (March 11 & 18, 2019)	Solo Battle (솔/로/대/첩)	Bona (Cosmic Girls); Jang Hee-jin; Kim Jae-young	Seokyeong University (Jeongneung-dong, Seongbuk District, Seoul)	Relationship Virgin (Yoo Jae-suk); Solo Brigade (Haha, Ji Suk-jin, Kim Jong-kook, Lee Kwang-soo, Song Ji-hyo, Yang Se-chan, Bona, Jang Hee-jin)	Secret Couple (Jeon So-min, Kim Jae-young)	Identify and eliminate the Secret Couple before they eliminate the Relationship Virgin or vote the Secret Couple out through 2 rounds of voting	Secret Couple Wins; Jeon So-min and Kim Jae-young each received a gold ring.
446	April 7, 2019 (March 11 & 18, 2019)	The Frog's Love Chase (개구리 연애 추격단)	Ha Seok-jin; Kim Ji-seok; Lee Yi-kyung	Heyri Art Valley (Tanhyeon-myeon, Paju, Gyeonggi Province)	Mission Team (Jeon So-min, Ha Seok-jin)	Running Man & Chasing Team (Yoo Jae-suk, Haha, Ji Suk-jin, Kim Jong-kook, Lee Kwang-soo, Song Ji-hyo, Yang Se-chan, Kim Ji-seok, Lee Yi-kyung)	Complete the dating schedule before the Chasing Team eliminate Jeon So-min to avoid receiving a penalty	Running Man and Chasing Team Wins; Kim Ji-seok and Lee Yi-kyung each received a diamond ring. Jeon So-min must pay all of her dating expenses and received the whipped cream penalty.
447 (Note: Special appearances by J-Black, MMary, professional tango dancers Kang Se-na and Kim Jin-woong.)	April 14, 2019 (March 18, 2019)	The Frog's Love Chase (개구리 연애 추격단)	Ha Seok-jin; Kim Ji-seok; Lee Yi-kyung	Heyri Art Valley (Tanhyeon-myeon, Paju, Gyeonggi Province)	Mission Team (Jeon So-min, Ha Seok-jin)	Running Man & Chasing Team (Yoo Jae-suk, Haha, Ji Suk-jin, Kim Jong-kook, Lee Kwang-soo, Song Ji-hyo, Yang Se-chan, Kim Ji-seok, Lee Yi-kyung)	Complete the dating schedule before the Chasing Team eliminate Jeon So-min to avoid receiving a penalty	Running Man and Chasing Team Wins; Kim Ji-seok and Lee Yi-kyung each received a diamond ring. Jeon So-min must pay all of her dating expenses and received the whipped cream penalty.
448	April 21, 2019 (March 26, 2019)	Please Find me (나를 찾아줘)	Han Bo-reum; Hani; Solji (EXID); Kim Hye-yoon; Mingyu; Seungkwan (SEVENTEEN)	Korean Stone Art Museum (Seongbuk-dong, Seongbuk District, Seoul)	Hye-yoon Team (Yoo Jae-suk, Lee Kwang-soo, Kim Hye-yoon); EXID Team (Haha, Ji Suk-jin, Hani, Solji); Bo-reum Team (Kim Jong-kook, Yang Se-chan, Han Bo-reum); SEVENTEEN Team (Song Ji-hyo, Jeon So-min, Mingyu, Seungkwan)		Be the one who is searched the most from 5pm till midnight	Bo-reum Team wins Kim Hye-yoon received a golden ring for having most viewed video on Instagram. Yoo Jae-suk and Lee Kwang-soo was chosen to get Viking penalty [see ep450].
449 (Note: Special appearance by Shin Ha-kyun at the end of race.)	April 28, 2019 (April 15, 2019)	Yoo-ames Bond Returns (유임스본드 리턴즈)	Esom; Kim Kyung-nam	Suwon Convention Centre (Yeongtong District, Suwon, Gyeonggi Province)	Yoo-ames Bond (Yoo Jae-suk); Bond Girl (Esom); Spy (Lee Kwang-soo); Mission Team (Haha, Ji Suk-jin, Kim Jong-kook, Song Ji-hyo, Jeon So-min, Yang Se-chan, Kim Kyung-nam)		Yoo-ames Bond & Bond Girl's mission: Eliminate the spy and cure the infected mission team members within 10 minutes after one's safe box is successfully opened to avoid penalty Spy's mission: Put quail eggs into each mission team members' hoodie to unveil the way to eliminate Yoo-ames Bond to avoid penalty and receive 100 000 dollars Mission Team's mission: Find safe box with your name attached on it and find Host S's safe box within 10 minutes upon opening your safe box to earn the prize money	Yoo-ames Bond and Bond Girl Wins; Yoo Jae-suk and Esom received the gold honor 'R' name card. Lee Kwang-soo got spanked by Shin Ha-kyun as a penalty.
450 (Note: Children's Day Special.)	May 5, 2019 (April 22, 2019)	The Runaway Name Case (이름 가출 사건)	Lee Dong-hwi	Cheongpung Lakeside Cable Car Station (Cheongpung-myeon, Jecheon, North Chungcheong-do)	Yoo Jae-suk Team (Yoo Jae-suk, Yang Se-chan, Lee Dong-hwi); Haha Team (Haha, Kim Jong-kook, Jeon So-min); Ji Suk-jin Team (Ji Suk-jin, Lee Kwang-soo, Song Ji-hyo)		Collect syllables to complete your team member's names to avoid penalty	Haha Team Wins; Yoo Jae-suk and Ji Suk-jin was chosen to get water slap on their faces as a penalty.
451 (Note: Teachers' Day and King Sejong the Great's Birthday Special.) (Note: PD Lee Hwan-jin's last episode as the temporary main PD.)	May 12, 2019 (April 29, 2019)	King Sejong the Great Race (세종대왕 레이스)	No guests	SBS Prism Tower (Sangam-dong, Mapo District, Seoul)	No teams		Be the last member standing on the platform	Haha Wins; Haha received ₩10,000 from opening his chosen suitcase.
452 (Note: Running Man's 9th anniversary fan meeting in Korea Project.) (Note: PD Jeong Cheol-min returns as the main PD.)	May 19, 2019 (May 7, 2019)	Loyal Security Race (의리담보 레이스)	No guests	Heyri Art Valley (Tanhyeon-myeon, Paju, Gyeonggi Province)	Running Man Team	Production Team	Complete 3 missions within 5 hours and avoid accumulating 3 Fail Stickers	Running Man Team Wins; Running Man Team won the rights to freely choose their choreography, which was revealed on episode 454.
453	May 26, 2019 (May 13, 2019)	What Happens to My Family (가족끼리 왜 이래)	Im Soo-hyang; Lee Sang-yeob	Gimpo Art Village (Unyang-dong, Gimpo, Gyeonggi Province)	Favorite Grandchild (Lee Kwang-soo) Real Grandchildren (Yoo Jae-suk, Ji Suk-jin, Kim Jong-kook, Song Ji-hyo, Jeon So-min, Yang Se-chan)	Fake Grandchild (Haha) Fake Grandparents (Im Soo-hyang, Lee Sang-yeob)	Identify and eliminate Fake Grandchild without eliminating 3 Real Grandchildren or Favorite Grandchild	Favorite Grandchild & Real Grandchildren Team Wins; Haha, Im Soo-hyang and Lee Sang-yeob received the water-bomb penalty. Yoo Jae-suk and Haha were chosen to be the first couple to perform at the fan-meeting show.
454 (Note: Special appearance by choreographer Lia Kim.)	June 2, 2019 (May 20 & 27, 2019)	9 Years of Running Man | A Burdensome Trade Race (런닝구(9) 프로젝트 | 부담거래 레이스)	No guests	SBS Prism Tower (Sangam-dong, Mapo District, Seoul)	Blue Team (Yoo Jae-suk, Song Ji-hyo); White Team (Haha, Yang Se-chan); Red Team (Ji Suk-jin, Kim Jong-kook); Yellow Team (Lee Kwang-soo, Jeon So-min)		Have the most "R" Money at the end of the race	Blue Team
455	June 9, 2019 (May 20, 21 & 27, 2019)	9 Years of Running Man | A Burdensome Trade Race (런닝구(9) 프로젝트 | 부담거래 레이스)	No guests	SBS Prism Tower (Sangam-dong, Mapo District, Seoul)	Blue Team (Yoo Jae-suk, Song Ji-hyo); White Team (Haha, Yang Se-chan); Red Team (Ji Suk-jin, Kim Jong-kook); Yellow Team (Lee Kwang-soo, Jeon So-min)		Have the most "R" Money at the end of the race	Blue Team
456	June 16, 2019 (June 3, 2019)	9 Years of Running Man | Figuring Out the Theme Race (런닝구(9) 프로젝트 | 주제 파악 레이스)	No guests	Gaesamteo Park (Nami-myeon, Geumsan County, South Chungcheong Province)	No teams		Have the most ginseng badges and avoid being the last one with the bomb sticker before the race ends	Yoo Jae-suk Wins; Song Ji-hyo had all her ginseng badges turned to venomous snake badges for being the last one with the bomb sticker. Yoo Jae-suk got a chance to decide the nicknames for each member for the theme song.
457	June 23, 2019 (June 17, 2019)	Balance Zero Race (잔고가 제로 레이스)	Chungha; Seol In-ah	Oil Tank Culture Park (Seongsan-dong, Mapo District, Seoul)	No teams		Have the most "R" Money at the end of the race	Yoo Jae-suk Wins; Seol In-ah, who had the least "R" money, chose Ji Suk-jin to do the water bomb penalty alongside Lee Kwang-soo, who went bankrupt.
458 (Note: Delayed for a week due to the live broadcast of the USA–North Korea summit. Kim, U. (June 30, 2019). "Update: More Variety Shows Not Airing Today Due To News Coverage". Soompi. Archived from the original on March 18, 2022.)	July 7, 2019 (June 18, 2019)	9 Years of Running Man | Boom Clap Race (런닝구(9) 프로젝트 | 쿵짝 레이스)	Code Kunst; Go Young-bae; Lee Tae-wook; Pyeon Yoo-il; Seo Myun-ho (Soran); Gummy; Jung Eun-ji; Kim Nam-joo; Oh Ha-young; Park Cho-rong; Son Na-eun; Yoon Bo-mi (Apink); Nucksal	Awesome Town (Deogyang District, Goyang, Gyeonggi Province)	3-Part Relay: Do You Trust Me? Green Team (Yoo Jae-suk, Jeon So-min, Go Young-bae, Lee Tae-wook, Pyeon Yoo-il, Seo Myun-ho); White Team (Haha, Song Ji-hyo, Code Kunst, Nucksal); Pink Team (Ji Suk-jin, Yang Se-chan, Jung Eun-ji, Kim Nam-joo, Oh Ha-young, Park Cho-rong, Son Na-eun, Yoon Bo-mi); Orange Team (Kim Jong-kook, Lee Kwang-soo, Gummy); Athlete Singing Contest: Pink Team (Yoo Jae-suk, Haha, Jung Eun-ji, Kim Nam-joo, Oh Ha-young, Park Cho-rong, Son Na-eun, Yoon Bo-mi); White Team (Ji Suk-jin, Song Ji-hyo, Code Kunst, Nucksal); Orange Team (Kim Jong-kook, Lee Kwang-soo, Gummy); Green Team (Jeon So-min, Yang Se-chan, Go Young-bae, Lee Tae-wook, Pyeon Yoo-il, Seo Myun-ho); Ride the Conveyor Belt & Answer: Pink Team (Yoo Jae-suk, Lee Kwang-soo, Jung Eun-ji, Kim Nam-joo, Oh Ha-young, Park Cho-rong, Son Na-eun, Yoon Bo-mi); Orange Team (Haha, Kim Jong-kook, Gummy); Green Team (Ji Suk-jin, Jeon So-min, Go Young-bae, Lee Tae-wook, Pyeon Yoo-il, Seo Myun-ho); White Team (Song Ji-hyo, Yang Se-chan, Code Kunst, Nucksal)		Win missions to earn rights to keep or change your team members before the race ends	No Winners; The finalized collaboration is as follows: Soran with (Yoo Jae-suk, Jeon So-min); Gummy with (Haha, Kim Jong-kook); Apink with (Ji Suk-jin, Lee Kwang-soo); Code Kunst and Nucksal with (Song Ji-hyo, Yang Se-chan)
459	July 14, 2019 (June 18 & 24, 2019)	9 Years of Running Man | Boom Clap Race (런닝구(9) 프로젝트 | 쿵짝 레이스)	Code Kunst; Go Young-bae; Lee Tae-wook; Pyeon Yoo-il; Seo Myun-ho (Soran); Gummy; Jung Eun-ji; Kim Nam-joo; Oh Ha-young; Park Cho-rong; Son Na-eun; Yoon Bo-mi (Apink); Nucksal	Awesome Town (Deogyang District, Goyang, Gyeonggi Province)			Win missions to earn rights to keep or change your team members before the race ends	No Winners; The finalized collaboration is as follows: Soran with (Yoo Jae-suk, Jeon So-min); Gummy with (Haha, Kim Jong-kook); Apink with (Ji Suk-jin, Lee Kwang-soo); Code Kunst and Nucksal with (Song Ji-hyo, Yang Se-chan)
460	July 21, 2019 (July 1, 2019)	Card Escape Race (카드 탈출 레이스)	Jo Jung-suk; Yoona (Girls' Generation)	Cheongshim World Peace Center (Seorak-myeon, Gapyeong County, Gyeonggi Province)	Mission Team (Yoo Jae-suk, Ji Suk-jin, Kim Jong-kook, Lee Kwang-soo, Song Ji-hyo, Jeon So-min, Yang Se-chan, Yoona)	Hunters (Haha, Jo Jung-suk)	Mission Team's Mission; Be the first four people to collect a correct set of 3 numbers to escape through any of four exit doors with each having a different condition to fulfil or identify and correctly place the hunters' nametags on the platform to end the race to avoid paying the expenses for the paradise place Hunters's Mission; Complete 3 hidden missions to unlock the exit and escape without getting eliminated to avoid the same penalty	Yoo Jae-suk, Ji Suk-jin, Lee Kwang-soo, Yang Se-chan and Hunters Wins; Kim Jong-kook, Song Ji-hyo, Jeon So-min and Yoona shared and paid ₩646,000 in expenses spent by those who escaped to the paradise place.
461	July 28, 2019 (July 22, 2019)	Unfamiliar Couple Race (낯선 커플 레이스)	Jang Jin-hee; Rothy; Seunghee (Oh My Girl); Song Ji-in	Sampoong Swimming Pool (Imok-dong, Jangan District, Suwon, Gyeonggi Province)	Orange Team (Yoo Jae-suk, Jang Jin-hee); Purple Team (Haha, Song Ji-in); Turquoise Team (Ji Suk-jin, Jeon So-min); White Team (Kim Jong-kook, Song Ji-hyo); Pink Team (Lee Kwang-soo, Rothy); Yellow Team (Yang Se-chan, Seunghee)		Have the most prize badges at the end of the race	Purple Team Wins; Haha and Song Ji-in each received a Korean beef set. Yellow Team, who had the most penalty badges, chose Pink Team to receive the indoor skydiving penalty together.
462 (Note: Special appearances by Athlete Choi Soo-in and Jung Joon-il.)	August 4, 2019 (July 2 & 29, 2019)	Why Can't You Eat? (왜 먹지를 못하니)	No guests	Gyeonggi Creation Center (Seongam-dong, Danwon District, Ansan, Gyeonggi Province)	No teams		Win missions to earn the rights to eat within 3 hours and accumlate the most eating duration to avoid penalty	Haha and Song Ji-hyo Wins; Haha and Song Ji-hyo were exempted from the penalty. Ji Suk-jin was chosen from a game of luck to dress up as someone else, along with Jeon So-min [See ep. 452], during the opening segment when there are guests, which was eventually fulfilled in episode 465.
463	August 11, 2019 (July 30, 2019)	Metamorphosis Race (변신 레이스)	Bae Seong-woo; Cho Yi-hyun; Kim Hye-jun; Sung Dong-il	Expert Academy (Daebudo, Danwon District, Ansan, Gyeonggi Province)	Human Team (Haha, Ji Suk-Jin, Lee Kwang-soo, Jeon So-min, Yang Se-chan, Bae Seong-woo, Cho Yi-hyun, Kim Hye-jun, Sung Dong-il); Poseidon (Song Ji-hyo); Zeus (Yoo Jae-Suk)	Hades (Kim Jong-kook) (Note: Hades pretended to be Zeus and he cannot lie to anyone that he is Zeus.)	Human Team, Poseidon & Zeus's mission: Identify and eliminate Hades by putting his wooden chair with nametag attached into the burn barrel Hades's mission: Eliminate both Poseidon and Zeus	Human Team, Poseidon and Zeus Wins; Everyone except for Kim Jong-kook received high-quality health nutritional supplement products.
464 (Note: National Liberation Day of Korea Special.)	August 18, 2019 (August 5, 2019)	Missing Emergency Fund Race (사라진 비상금 레이스)	No guests	Sookmyung Women's University (Cheongpa-dong, Yongsan District, Seoul)	Children Team (Yoo Jae-suk, Haha, Kim Jong-kook, Lee Kwang-soo, Song Ji-hyo, Jeon So-min); Father (Ji Suk-jin); Stranger (Yang Se-chan)		Father's mission Uncover and enter his true identity in the correct platform to win Stranger's mission Eliminate Father to gain the prize money accumulated for each Child eliminated Child Team's mission Eliminate the Father and Stranger to split the prize money between the Child Team's member OR be the sole Child to eliminate both Father and Stranger to gain the whole prize money for himself	Father Wins; Ji Suk-jin received ₩6,000,000, which was donated to the Korean Independence Organization and covering the cost of the penalty incurred in the race.
465 (Note: Ji Suk-jin dressed up as King Byeonseong while Jeon So-min dressed up as Billy the Puppet during the opening segment to fulfill past penalties (See ep. 452 and 462).)	August 25, 2019 (August 12, 2019)	God of The Game: Don't Trust Anyone (승부의 신－누구도 믿지 마라)	Choi Yu-hwa; Lim Ji-yeon; Park Jung-min	Unknown	No Teams		Accumulate R money from winning missions and Full House to win prizes and avoid having negative R money at the end of the race to avoid penalty	Yoo Jae-suk, Kim Jong-kook, Yang Se-chan, Choi Yu-hwa and Lim Ji-yeon Wins; Kim Jong-kook and Lim Ji-yeon each received a noni juice set. Yoo Jae-suk, Yang Se-chan and Choi Yu-hwa each received portable mini fans. Ji Suk-jin, Song Ji-hyo and Park Jung-min were exempted from penalty. Lee Kwang-soo received whipped cream penalty while Haha and Jeon So-min got water bomb penalty.
466	September 1, 2019 (August 20, 2019)	War of The Light: Black and White (빛의 전쟁－흑과 백)	Jang Ye-won; Kim Ye-won; Sunmi; Sunny (Girls' Generation)	SBS Tanhyeon-dong Production Center (Ilsanseo District, Goyang, Gyeonggi Province)	Human Team (Yoo Jae-suk, Ji Suk-jin, Kim Jong-kook, Lee Kwang-soo, Song Ji-hyo, Jeon So-min, Yang Se-chan, Jang Ye-won, Kim Ye-won, Sunmi); Deity of Light (Sunny)	Deity of Darkness & The Prophet (Haha) (Note: Haha took on the Prophet role as well so that hints between the Deity of Darkness and the Deity of Light would be swapped to confuse the members.)	Deity of Light and Human Team's mission Identity and eliminate the Deity of Darkness without eliminating the Deity of Light; Deity of Darkness & The Prophet's mission Identify and eliminate the Deity of Light	Deity of Light and Human Team Wins; Everyone except Haha each received a peach gift set.
467 (Note: Special appearances by Lia Kim (Only appeared in Ep. 467 & Ep. 469), Skull, Yeji (singer), Lia (South Korean singer), Ryujin (rapper), Chaeryeong and Yuna (ITZY) (Only appeared in Ep. 468), Hong Jin-young and Yoon Mi-rae (Only appeared in Ep. 469).)	September 8, 2019 (July 8, August 20 & 26, 2019)	9 Years of Running Man: Running Man 9th Anniversary Fan Meeting (런닝구(9) 프로젝트－런닝맨 9주년 팬미팅)	Jang Ye-won; Kim Ye-won; Sunmi; Sunny (Girls' Generation)	SBS Tanhyeon-dong Production Center (Ilsanseo District, Goyang, Gyeonggi Province)	Human Team (Yoo Jae-suk, Ji Suk-jin, Kim Jong-kook, Lee Kwang-soo, Song Ji-hyo, Jeon So-min, Yang Se-chan, Jang Ye-won, Kim Ye-won, Sunmi); Deity of Light (Sunny)	Deity of Darkness & The Prophet (Haha)	Deity of Light and Human Team's mission Identity and eliminate the Deity of Darkness without eliminating the Deity of Light; Deity of Darkness & The Prophet's mission Identify and eliminate the Deity of Light	Deity of Light and Human Team Wins; Everyone except Haha each received a peach gift set.
467	September 8, 2019 (July 8, August 20 & 26, 2019)	9 Years of Running Man: Running Man 9th Anniversary Fan Meeting (런닝구(9) 프로젝트－런닝맨 9주년 팬미팅)	Code Kunst; Go Young-bae; Lee Tae-wook; Pyeon Yoo-il; Seo Myun-ho (Soran); Gummy; Jung Eun-ji; Kim Nam-joo; Oh Ha-young; Park Cho-rong; Son Na-eun; Yoon Bo-mi (Apink); Nucksal	Ewha Womans University (Daehyeon-dong, Seodaemun District, Seoul)	Running Man members	Spy (Fans)	Identify and correctly vote for the Spy at the end of the fan meeting to avoid penalty (Note: Only the Running Man members participated in this mission. Spy's mission To enjoy the Fan Meeting as much as possible.)	Kim Jong-kook and Spy Wins; Haha, Lee Kwang-soo, Song Ji-hyo and Jeon So-min were chosen through a game of luck to receive the whipped cream penalty.
468	September 15, 2019 (August 26, 2019)	9 Years of Running Man: The Spy Game (런닝구(9) 프로젝트－스파이게임)	Code Kunst; Go Young-bae; Lee Tae-wook; Pyeon Yoo-il; Seo Myun-ho (Soran); Gummy; Jung Eun-ji; Kim Nam-joo; Oh Ha-young; Park Cho-rong; Son Na-eun; Yoon Bo-mi (Apink); Nucksal	Ewha Womans University (Daehyeon-dong, Seodaemun District, Seoul)	Running Man members	Spy (Fans)	Identify and correctly vote for the Spy at the end of the fan meeting to avoid penalty	Kim Jong-kook and Spy Wins; Haha, Lee Kwang-soo, Song Ji-hyo and Jeon So-min were chosen through a game of luck to receive the whipped cream penalty.
469	September 22, 2019 (August 26, 2019)	9 Years of Running Man: Grand Final (런닝구(9) 팬미팅－그랜드 파이널)	Code Kunst; Go Young-bae; Lee Tae-wook; Pyeon Yoo-il; Seo Myun-ho (Soran); Gummy; Jung Eun-ji; Kim Nam-joo; Oh Ha-young; Park Cho-rong; Son Na-eun; Yoon Bo-mi (Apink); Nucksal	Ewha Womans University (Daehyeon-dong, Seodaemun District, Seoul)	Running Man members	Spy (Fans)	Identify and correctly vote for the Spy at the end of the fan meeting to avoid penalty	Kim Jong-kook and Spy Wins; Haha, Lee Kwang-soo, Song Ji-hyo and Jeon So-min were chosen through a game of luck to receive the whipped cream penalty.
470	September 29, 2019 (September 9, 2019)	What Happened on Vacation (휴가지에서 생긴 일)	No guests	Yeongok Fishing Spot (Baekseok-eup, Yangju, Gyeonggi Province)	No Teams		Have the least penalty badge at the end of the race	Yoo Jae-suk, Haha, Kim Jong-kook, Lee Kwang-soo, Song Ji-hyo, Jeon So-min and Yang Se-chan Wins; Ji Suk-jin (Note: As Ji Suk-jin and Lee Kwang-soo had the same amount of penalty badges, Yang Se-chan as the last host gets to choose between the two whom to receive the punishment.) picked the penalty of going to a warehouse at minus 17.5 degrees for handling goods through a draw among the remaining unpicked activities.
471 (Note: Hangeul Day Special.)	October 6, 2019 (September 23, 2019)	Secret Code: Autumn Attacks (시크릿 코드－가을 습격사건)	Hwang Chi-yeul; Kang Mi-na (Gugudan); Park Yoo-na; Tiffany (Girls' Generation)	Provence Photoland (Hwayang-eup, Cheongdo County, North Gyeongsang-do)	Brown Team (Yoo Jae-suk, Lee Kwang-soo, Hwang Chi-yeul); Green Team (Haha, Jeon So-min, Kang Mi-na); Grey Team (Ji Suk-jin, Song Ji-hyo, Tiffany); Orange Team (Kim Jong-kook, Yang Se-chan, Park Yoo-na)		Have the most persimmon badge at the end of the race	Green Team Wins; Jeon So-min won the rights to publish her own writing font for being the member in her team with the most persimmon badges. Grey Team, which had the least persimmon badges, have to peel off 100 persimmon skins as penalty.
472	October 13, 2019 (September 24, 2019)	Flashing Downtown Pursuit: What Happened in Anyang (일명타진 추격전－안양에서 생긴 일)	No guests	Anyang Temple Museum (Seoksu-dong, Manan District, Anyang, Gyeonggi Province)	Runaways (Yoo Jae-suk, Lee Kwang-soo, Yang Se-chan (Note: The runaways are decided through a fake starting mission))	Chasing Team (Haha, Ji Suk-jin, Kim Jong-kook, Song Ji-hyo, Jeon So-min (Note: Every time the chasing team eliminates a runaway, the latter would join the chasing team for the remaining duration of the race.))	Runaways's mission Find and certify 3 places of memories of Kim Jong-kook and escape from the Chasing Team; Chasing Team's mission Eliminate all of the Runaways	Chasing Team Wins; Chasing Team received ₩3,000,000, which was distributed by Kim Jong-kook.
473 (Note: Special appearance by Han Ki-bum)	October 20, 2019 (September 30, 2019)	Joker's House (조커의 집)	No guests	Studio Colline (Yeonhui-dong, Seodaemun District, Seoul)	Human Team (Haha, Ji Suk-jin, Kim Jong-kook, Lee Kwang-soo, Song Ji-hyo, Jeon So-min, Yang Se-chan (Note: Each time when a member gets infected, the latter will need to infect other members on behalf of the Bio Terrorist.))	Bio Terrorist (Yoo Jae-suk (Note: The Bio Terrorist cannot infect the members himself, because he is immune to the virus.))	Human Team's mission Complete all planned activities within 6 hours and complete all 4 mission routes (Note: Members who failed to pass the mission will get infected by the virus.) to unveil the way to eliminate the Bio Terrorist. Bio Terrorist's mission Hinder with the Human Team's mission. Infected Member's mission Rip off any remaining Human's nametag using your mouth to infect them.	Haha and Kim Jong-kook Wins; Haha and Kim Jong-kook each received a gold diamond ring. Song Ji-hyo, Jeon So-min and Yang Se-chan, who were not chosen by Haha and Kim Jong-kook was revealed and carried out the penalty with Yoo Jae-suk in Ep 475.
474	October 27, 2019 (October 14, 2019)	Treacherous Bullion (배반의 금괴)	Go Min-si; Hwang Bo-ra	Chowon Garden (Haengju-dong, Deogyang District, Goyang, Gyeonggi Province)	Mission Team (Yoo Jae-suk, Haha, Ji Suk-jin, Lee Kwang-soo, Song Ji-hyo, Jeon So-min, Go Min-si, Hwang Bo-ra)	Thieves Team (Kim Jong-kook, Yang Se-chan)	Capture the Bullion Thieves	Mission Team Wins; Hwang Bo-ra, who had the most bullions, received a "R" ring. Go Min-si, who had the least bullions and did not correctly vote for either of the Thieves, received the water bomb penalty together with Thieves Team.
475 (Note: Yoo Jae-suk dressed up as Alpaca, Song Ji-hyo dressed up as Red Angry Bird, Jeon So-min dressed up as a Minion while Yang Se-chan dressed up as Ursula during the opening segment to fulfill past penalties (See ep. 473).)	November 3, 2019 (October 15, 2019)	Autumn Delicacies Race (가을 별미 레이스)	Hong Hyun-hee; Park Ji-hyun	Unknown	Mission Team (Yoo Jae-suk, Haha, Ji Suk-jin, Kim Jong-kook, Lee Kwang-soo, Song Ji-hyo, Yang Se-chan, Park Ji-hyun)	Greedy Pigs (Jeon So-min, Hong Hyun-hee)	Apprehend both of the Greedy Pigs	Greedy Pigs Wins; Kim Jong-kook and Lee Kwang-soo were chosen to receive the car washing penalty.
476	November 10, 2019 (October 28, 2019)	Mysterious Animal Farm (신비한 동물농장)	Hyuna; Kang Han-na; Lee Guk-joo; Sihyeon (Everglow)	SBS Tanhyeon-dong Production Center (Ilsanseo District, Goyang, Gyeonggi Province)	Team games Pig Team (Yoo Jae-suk, Hyuna); Rabbit Team (Haha, Jeon So-min); Fox Team (Ji Suk-jin, Kang Han-na); Snake Team (Kim Jong-kook, Sihyeon); Tiger Team (Lee Kwang-soo, Lee Guk-joo); Bear Team (Song Ji-hyo, Yang Se-chan)	Apprehend the Prohibited Animals; Animal Team (Yoo Jae-suk, Haha, Ji Suk-jin, Kim Jong-kook, Lee Kwang-soo, Jeon So-min, Yang Se-chan, Hyuna, Lee Guk-joo, Sihyeon); Prohibited Animals (Song Ji-hyo, Kang Han-na)	Identify and eliminate the Prohibited Animals	Animal Team Wins; Song Ji-hyo and Kang Han-na received the water bomb penalty.
477 (Note: Special appearances by Onda, Yiren (Everglow).)	November 17, 2019 (October 28 & November 11, 2019)	Broadcasting Station Ghost Story: The Legendary [Proposal] (방송국 괴담－전설의 [기획-안])	Hyuna; Kang Han-na; Lee Guk-joo; Sihyeon (Everglow)	SBS Tanhyeon-dong Production Center (Ilsanseo District, Goyang, Gyeonggi Province)	Team games Pig Team (Yoo Jae-suk, Hyuna); Rabbit Team (Haha, Jeon So-min); Fox Team (Ji Suk-jin, Kang Han-na); Snake Team (Kim Jong-kook, Sihyeon); Tiger Team (Lee Kwang-soo, Lee Guk-joo); Bear Team (Song Ji-hyo, Yang Se-chan)	Apprehend the Prohibited Animals; Animal Team (Yoo Jae-suk, Haha, Ji Suk-jin, Kim Jong-kook, Lee Kwang-soo, Jeon So-min, Yang Se-chan, Hyuna, Lee Guk-joo, Sihyeon); Prohibited Animals (Song Ji-hyo, Kang Han-na)	Identify and eliminate the Prohibited Animals	Animal Team Wins; Song Ji-hyo and Kang Han-na received the water bomb penalty.
477	November 17, 2019 (October 28 & November 11, 2019)	Broadcasting Station Ghost Story: The Legendary [Proposal] (방송국 괴담－전설의 [기획-안])	Choi Ri; Heo Kyung-hwan; Jinyoung (Got7); Seo Eun-soo	SBS Broadcasting Center (Mok-dong, Yangcheon District, Seoul)	Straight Face TV Station; New Producer Team (Yoo Jae-suk, Ji Suk-jin, Yang Se-chan, Seo Eun-soo); Producer Team (Haha, Lee Kwang-soo, Song Ji-hyo, Heo Kyung-hwan); Writer Team (Kim Jong-kook, Jeon So-min, Choi Ri, Jinyoung)		Dalim Man Crew's mission Identify and eliminate the Coughing and Clacking Ghosts and assistant director before they eliminate the Main Producer or obtain the legendary proposal Coughing, Clacking Ghost and Assistant Director's mission Identify and eliminate the Main Producer and obtain the legendary proposal Coughing, Clacking Ghost, assistant director and Main Producer's additional mission Eliminate any 2 members in order to gain immunity	Main Producer and Dalim Man Crew Wins; Kim Jong-kook and Seo Eun-soo received the whipped cream penalty.
478 (Note: Special appearances by Kim Yoon-sang and Han Ki-bum.)	November 24, 2019 (November 11, 2019)	Broadcasting Station Ghost Story: The Legendary [Proposal] Part.2 (방송국 괴담－전설의 [기획-안]2)	Choi Ri; Heo Kyung-hwan; Jinyoung (Got7); Seo Eun-soo	SBS Broadcasting Center (Mok-dong, Yangcheon District, Seoul)	Dalim Man Crew (Yoo Jae-suk, Haha, Ji Suk-jin, Song Ji-hyo, Jeon So-min, Yang Se-chan, Choi Ri, Heo Kyung-hwan, Jinyoung); Main Producer (Lee Kwang-soo)	Clacking Ghost (Kim Jong-kook); Coughing Ghost & Assistant Director (Seo Eun-soo)	Dalim Man Crew's mission Identify and eliminate the Coughing and Clacking Ghosts and assistant director before they eliminate the Main Producer or obtain the legendary proposal Coughing, Clacking Ghost and Assistant Director's mission Identify and eliminate the Main Producer and obtain the legendary proposal Coughing, Clacking Ghost, assistant director and Main Producer's additional mission Eliminate any 2 members in order to gain immunity	Main Producer and Dalim Man Crew Wins; Kim Jong-kook and Seo Eun-soo received the whipped cream penalty.
479	December 1, 2019 (November 18, 2019)	Along With Distrust (불신과 함께)	No guests	943 King's Cross Harry Potter Cafe (Seogyo-dong, Mapo District, Seoul)	No Teams		Have the most candy and avoid being the last 2 with the least candy at the end of the race.	Yang Se-chan Wins; Lee Kwang-soo and Jeon So-min, who had the least candy, chose Kim Jong-kook to dress up as Yondu and sell 100 fishcakes as a penalty together.
480	December 8, 2019 (November 19, 2019)	Running Man Investment Promotion Project (런닝맨 투자 유치 프로젝트)	Kang Han-na; Lee Hee-jin; YooA (Oh My Girl); Yoo Byung-jae	Space Avanshow (Tanhyeon-myeon, Paju, Gyeonggi Province)	No Teams		Have the most "R" money at the end of the race	Yoo Byung-jae Wins; Yoo Byung-jae received a "R" ring. Lee Hee-jin, who had the least "R" money, received the water bomb penalty.
481	December 15, 2019 (November 25, 2019)	Bound for Incheon: Ace of Aces (인천행－에이스 오브 에이스)	Chanmi; Hyejeong; Jimin; Seolhyun; Yuna (AOA)	Wolmi Traditional Park (Bukseong-dong, Jung District, Incheon	Red Team (Yoo Jae-suk, Ji Suk-jin, Yang Se-chan, Chanmi, Hyejeong); Blue Team (Haha, Lee Kwang-soo, Jeon So-min, Jimin); Green Team (Kim Jong-kook, Song Ji-hyo, Seolhyun, Yuna)		Have the most dining coupons and avoid having the most penalty badges at the end of the race	Green Team Wins; Jimin was chosen through a game of luck and chose Lee Kwang-soo to receive the whipped green cream penalty together.
482 (Note: Special appearances by Adria Arjona, Mélanie Laurent and Ryan Reynolds.)	December 22, 2019 (December 2, 2019)	The Ghost Hunter Race (고스트 헌터 레이스)	Hwang Bo-ra; Ryan Reynolds; Melanie Laurent; Adria Arjona	Four Seasons Hotel Seoul (Dangju-dong, Jongno District, Seoul	Hunter Team (Haha, Ji Suk-jin, Lee Kwang-soo, Song Ji-hyo, Jeon So-min, Yang Se-chan, Hwang Bo-ra)	Ghosts (Yoo Jae-suk, Kim Jong-kook)	Avoid slots containing a ghost on the penalty roulette (if any) to avoid punishment	Hunter Team Wins; Both Yoo Jae-suk and Kim Jong-kook had to wear bald wigs while receiving pelvis massage penalty.
483 (Note: Cannes Film Festival Special.)	December 29, 2019 (December 16, 2019)	Cannes Film Festival: The Uninvited One Race (깐 영화제－초대받지 못한 자 레이스)	Heo Kyung-hwan; Jun Hyo-seong; Kang Tae-oh (5urprise); Yoyomi	SBS Tanhyeon-dong Production Center (Ilsanseo District, Goyang, Gyeonggi Province)	No teams		Find and eliminate all the Directors before they eliminate the National Actor [See ep. 484 List of Running Man episodes (2020)].	The results will be revealed on the next episode [See ep. 484 List of Running Man episodes (2020)].

== Viewership ==
Average TV viewership ratings
Ep.	Original broadcast date	Nielsen Korea		TNmS
Ep.	Original broadcast date	Nationwide	Seoul	Nationwide
433	January 6, 2019	7.3% (18th)	8.2% (16th)	8.2% (15th)
434	January 13, 2019	—	7.0% (20th)	7.2% (16th)
435	January 20, 2019	7.3% (17th)	7.5% (19th)	6.9% (16th)
436	January 27, 2019	—	6.6% (20th)	7.6% (17th)
437	February 3, 2019	—	—	7.1% (16th)
438	February 10, 2019	7.8% (18th)	8.1% (18th)	8.0% (16th)
439	February 17, 2019	6.7% (19th)	—	7.9% (13th)
440	February 24, 2019	6.5% (18th)	7.0% (17th)	7.1% (17th)
441	March 3, 2019	6.5% (17th)	6.7% (14th)	—
442	March 10, 2019	6.7% (18th)	6.8% (16th)	6.9% (16th)
443	March 17, 2019	7.5% (15th)	8.5% (13th)	7.4% (14th)
444	March 24, 2019	6.7% (12th)	7.4% (12th)	7.2% (15th)
445	March 31, 2019	6.9% (13th)	7.3% (14th)	8.3% (12th)
446	April 7, 2019	6.5% (14th)	6.4% (16th)	6.7% (16th)
447	April 14, 2019	6.7% (16th)	6.9% (17th)	7.2% (17th)
448	April 21, 2019	6.0% (18th)	6.4% (19th)	6.6% (17th)
449	April 28, 2019	7.0% (14th)	7.4% (15th)	7.2% (17th)
450	May 5, 2019	5.4% (18th)	5.9% (16th)	5.9% (16th)
451	May 12, 2019	6.4% (14th)	6.9% (14th)	7.2% (16th)
452	May 19, 2019	8.1% (15th)	8.4% (15th)	8.2% (16th)
453	May 26, 2019	6.0% (19th)	6.6% (15th)	7.2% (15th)
454	June 2, 2019	6.1% (17th)	6.6% (17th)	6.3% (17th)
455	June 9, 2019	6.6% (16th)	6.7% (18th)	6.5% (18th)
456	June 16, 2019	6.3% (19th)	—	6.4% (20th)
457	June 23, 2019	6.4% (17th)	7.0% (16th)	7.1% (16th)
458	July 7, 2019	6.4% (16th)	6.7% (16th)	7.7% (14th)
459	July 14, 2019	—	—	—
460	July 21, 2019	6.9% (17th)	7.2% (16th)	7.1%
461	July 29, 2019	—	—	—N/a
462	August 4, 2019	5.7% (20th)	5.7% (20th)	—N/a
463	August 11, 2019	6.2% (16th)	7.1% (15th)	—N/a
464	August 18, 2019	6.1% (18th)	—	—N/a
465	August 25, 2019	6.4% (15th)	6.9% (14th)	7.1% (14th)
466	September 1, 2019	5.7% (18th)	5.3% (19th)	7.0% (15th)
467	September 8, 2019	6.7% (16th)	6.7% (16th)	8.0% (15th)
468	September 15, 2019	6.3% (20th)	6.7% (18th)	7.3% (15th)
469	September 22, 2019	7.4% (15th)	7.6% (12th)	8.1% (16th)
470	September 30, 2019	—	—	—
471	October 6, 2019	6.8% (13th)	7.1% (14th)	7.3% (15th)
472	October 13, 2019	6.1% (15th)	6.4% (13th)	7.4% (16th)
473	October 20, 2019	6.2% (16th)	6.6% (15th)	6.8% (17th)
474	October 27, 2019	6.5% (14th)	7.2% (12th)	7.8% (13th)
475	November 3, 2019	6.6% (17th)	7.2% (15th)	7.4% (15th)
476	November 10, 2019	7.3% (16th)	7.8% (14th)	8.2% (13th)
477	November 17, 2019	7.9% (10th)	8.3% (11th)	7.9% (12th)
478	November 24, 2019	6.8% (18th)	7.5% (17th)	7.5% (15th)
479	December 1, 2019	7.1% (16th)	7.6% (17th)	8.5% (14th)
480	December 8, 2019	7.0% (18th)	7.1% (19th)	8.4% (13th)
481	December 15, 2019	7.3% (16th)	8.4% (13th)	7.3% (17th)
482	December 22, 2019	7.4% (17th)	7.6% (18th)	7.3% (16th)
483	December 29, 2019	—	—	—N/a
TNmS ratings listed is the highest ratings amongst ratings for each episodes.; "—" denotes episode didn't enter top 20 in Nielsen Korea and TNmS ratings.
