= Sajik-dong =

Sajik-dong (Hangul:사직동 Hanja:社稷洞) refers to one of the below dongs in cities of South Korea:

- Sajik-dong, Seoul in Jongno-gu, Seoul
- Sajik-dong, Cheonan in Dongnam-gu, Cheonan, Chungcheongnam-do
- Sajik-dong, Gwangju in Namgu, Gwangju
- Sajik-dong, Cheongju in Heungdeok-gu, Cheongju
- Sajik-dong, Busan in Dongnae-gu, Busan
