= Pirun-dong =

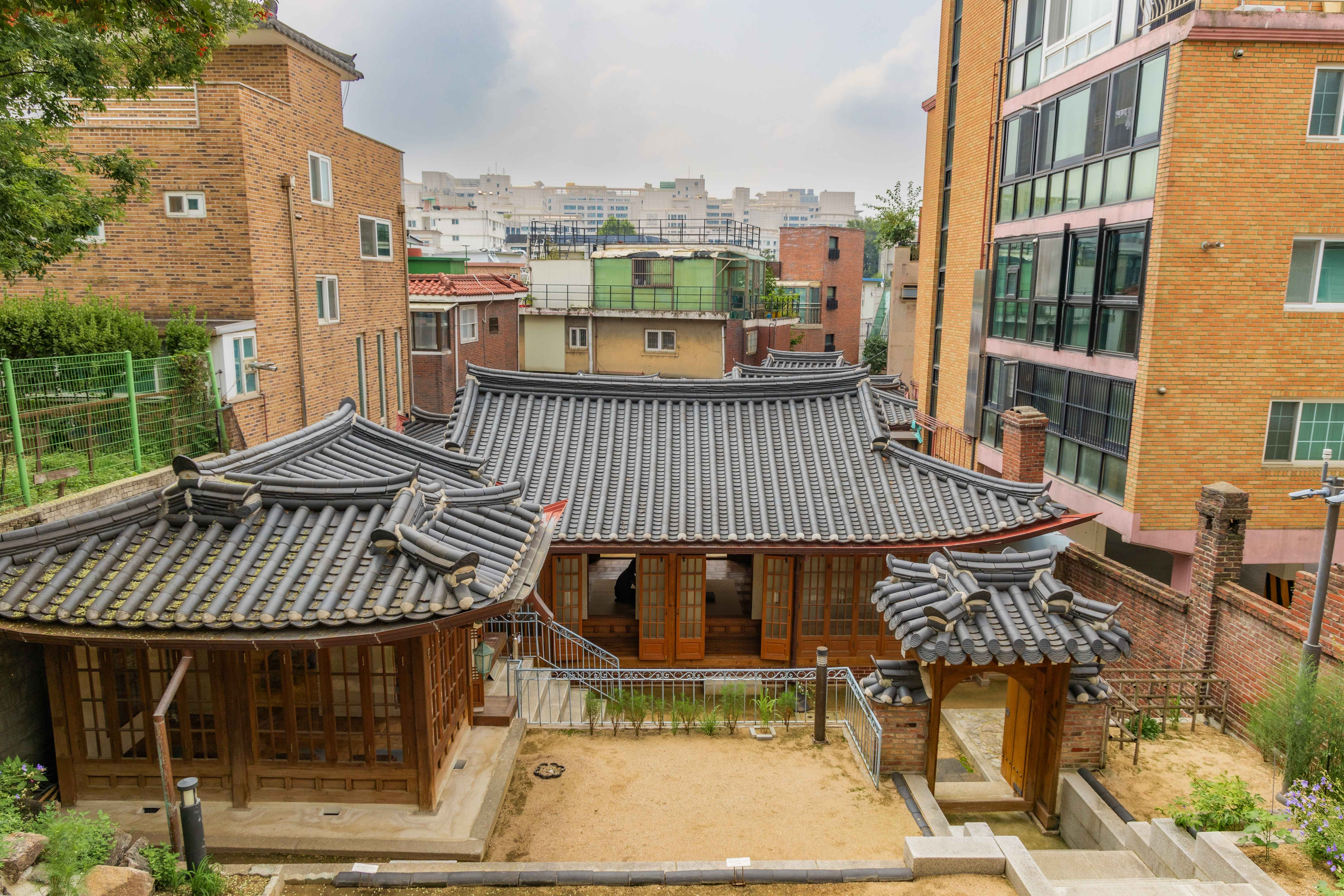
- House of Hong Geonik in Pirun-dong
- Interactive map of Pirun-dong
- Country: South Korea

Area
  - Total: 0.09 km^{2} (0.035 sq mi)

Korean name
- Hangul: 필운동
- Hanja: 弼雲洞
- RR: Pirun-dong
- MR: P'irun-dong

Pirun-dong (Korean: 필운동) is a dong (neighbourhood) of Jongno District, Seoul, South Korea. It is a legal dong (법정동) administered under its administrative dong (행정동), Sajik-dong.

== See also ==
- Administrative divisions of South Korea
