= List of Running Man episodes (2020) =

- No. of episodes: 52

Release
- Original network: SBS
- Original release: January 5 – December 27, 2020

Season chronology
- ← Previous; 2019 Next → 2021

This is a list of episodes of the South Korean variety show Running Man in 2020. The show airs on SBS as part of their Good Sunday lineup.

== Episodes ==
List of episodes (484–535)
Ep.	Airdate (Filming date)	Title	Guest(s)	Landmark	Teams		Mission	Results
484 (Note: Cannes Film Festival Special.)	January 5, 2020 (December 16 & 31, 2019)	"Ggannes" Film Festival ('깐' 영화제)	Heo Kyung-hwan; Jun Hyo-seong; Kang Tae-oh (5urprise); YOYOMI	SBS Tanhyeon-dong Production Center (Ilsanseo District, Goyang, Gyeonggi Province)	Actor Team (Yoo Jae-suk, Haha, Ji Suk-jin, Kim Jong-kook, Song Ji-hyo, Jeon So-min, Heo Kyung-hwan, Kang Tae-oh, YOYOMI) (Note: Haha and Jeon So-min are actors playing the fake Director role.); National Actor (Yang Se-chan)	Directors (Lee Kwang-soo, Jun Hyo-seong)	Actor Team's mission Identify and apprehend both of the Directors through 2 rounds of trial National Actor's mission Eliminate both of the Directors; Director's mission Eliminate both of the fake Directors (Note: The Directors must eliminate both of the fake Directors first before they are allowed to eliminate the National Actor.) and the National Actor and without eliminating 3 Actors.	Directors Wins; Yang Se-chan chose Heo Kyung-hwan to receive the water bomb penalty together.
484	January 5, 2020 (December 16 & 31, 2019)	We Won't Harm You Race (해치지 않아 레이스)	Ahn Jae-hong; Jeon Yeo-been; Kang So-ra; Kim Sung-oh	Sookmyung Women's University (Cheongpa-dong, Yongsan District, Seoul)	Red Team (Yoo Jae-suk, Lee Kwang-soo, Kang So-ra); Yellow Team (Haha, Yang Se-chan, Ahn Jae-hong); Orange Team (Ji Suk-jin, Song Ji-hyo, Jeon Yeo-been); Black Team (Kim Jong-kook, Jeon So-min, Kim Sung-oh)		Individual mission Without having the most penalty badges at the end of the race Human Team's mission Protect the Reincarnated Humans; Reincarnated Humans's mission Eliminate all the Deities of Death or without placing any Deities of Death on the judgement stand Deities of Death's mission Eliminate both Reincarnated Humans within 30 minutes	Human Team and Reincarnated Humans Wins; Kim Jong-kook, who has the most penalty badges received the flogging penalty. Yoo Jae-suk was exempted from the penalty with a game of luck. Haha, Ji Suk-jin, Lee Kwang-soo and Kang So-ra received the water bomb penalty.
485	January 12, 2020 (December 31, 2019)	We Won't Harm You Race (해치지 않아 레이스)	Ahn Jae-hong; Jeon Yeo-been; Kang So-ra; Kim Sung-oh	Sookmyung Women's University (Cheongpa-dong, Yongsan District, Seoul)	Human Team (Kim Jong-kook, Song Ji-hyo, Jeon So-min, Yang Se-chan, Jeon Yeo-been); Reincarnated Humans (Ahn Jae-hong, Kim Sung-oh)	Deities of Death (Note: During each round, the producer will randomly draw 2 balls with the members and guests' names on them for them to join the Deities of Death. If the member chosen is already a Deity of Death, that chance would be forfeited.) (Yoo Jae-suk^{R2}, Haha^{R1}, Ji Suk-jin^{R3}, Lee Kwang-soo^{R1}, Kang So-ra^{R3})	Individual mission Without having the most penalty badges at the end of the race Human Team's mission Protect the Reincarnated Humans; Reincarnated Humans's mission Eliminate all the Deities of Death or without placing any Deities of Death on the judgement stand Deities of Death's mission Eliminate both Reincarnated Humans within 30 minutes	Human Team and Reincarnated Humans Wins; Kim Jong-kook, who has the most penalty badges received the flogging penalty. Yoo Jae-suk was exempted from the penalty with a game of luck. Haha, Ji Suk-jin, Lee Kwang-soo and Kang So-ra received the water bomb penalty.
486	January 19, 2020 (December 30, 2019)	Card, We're Going to Trade Now (카드, 지금 바꾸러 갑니다)	Kang Han-na; Keum Sae-rok; Lee Joo-young; Park Cho-rong (Apink)	MoA Studio (Maekgeum-dong, Paju, Gyeonggi Province)	Cyan Team (Yoo Jae-suk, Lee Joo-young); Purple Team (Haha, Song Ji-hyo); Green Team (Ji Suk-jin, Keum Sae-rok); Silver Team (Kim Jong-kook, Kang Han-na); Grey Team (Lee Kwang-soo, Park Cho-rong); Yellow Team (Jeon So-min, Yang Se-chan)		Collect a set consisting of a prize and element card while without having a penalty card	Cyan Team and Purple Team Wins; Yoo Jae-suk and Lee Joo-young received an abalone set and Haha and Song Ji-hyo received an air purifier. Lee Kwang-soo and Park Cho-rong received the flogging penalty by Yoo Jae-suk and Lee Joo-young respectively while Jeon So-min and Yang Se-chan received the blue whipped cream penalty.
487 (Note: New Year's Special.) (Note: Special appearance by fortune teller Park Sung-joon.)	January 26, 2020 (December 17, 2019)	The Rat Holds the Briefcase with Money (돈가방을 든 쥐)	No guests	Heyri Art Valley (Tanhyeon-myeon, Paju, Gyeonggi Province)	Running Man (Kim Jong-kook, Lee Kwang-soo, Jeon So-min, Yang Se-chan)	Snakes (Yoo Jae-suk, Haha, Ji Suk-jin, Song Ji-hyo)	Complete missions (Note: If the majority who completed a mission is a Running Man, the hint on the passcode will be given. Otherwise, a hint related to the Snakes will be given instead.) to find out the remaining 5 digits of the passcode, open the briefcase and take the money to earn the rights to distribute it within the team	Snakes Wins; Haha received ₩1,000,000 for being the last to hold the money and distributed the money to everyone, however, the members gave the full amount back to the production crew.
488	February 2, 2020 (January 6, 2020)	Empty House: Oh My Thief (빈집：오 마이 도둑)	Park Ha-na	The StarHue Golf & Resort (Gosong-ri, Yangdong-myeon, Yangpyeong County, Gyeonggi Province)	Thieves (Yoo Jae-suk, Haha, Ji Suk-jin, Kim Jong-kook, Song Ji-hyo, Jeon So-min, Yang Se-chan, Park Ha-na)	Police Officer (Lee Kwang-soo)	Thieves's mission Find hints related to the Tears of Yondu, uncover the truth behind it, identify and eliminate the Police Officer to gain the Tears of Yondu; Police Officer's mission Eliminate all of the Thieves	Thieves Wins; Song Ji-hyo receives the Tears of Yondu by eliminating the Police Officer. Lee Kwang-soo received the water cannon penalty.
489 (Note: Ji Suk-jin's birthday and Jeon So-min's writer debut double celebrations special.) (Note: Special appearance by Park Geun-sik.)	February 9, 2020 (January 13, 2020)	Outgoing Race (출출한 레이스)	No guests	Nodeulseom (Ichon-dong, Yongsan District, Seoul)	Ji Suk-jin Team (Ji Suk-jin, Yoo Jae-suk, Haha, Song Ji-hyo)	Jeon So-min Team (Jeon So-min, Kim Jong-kook, Lee Kwang-soo, Yang Se-chan)	Have the most wins at the end of the race to earn the rights to choose a 'good' prize (Note: Only the Captain of the winning team is given a choice to choose. However, if the Captain goes for the 100-inch TV over the member's prize, the team members will not receive a single prize. Otherwise, a prize badge is given to everyone on his team.) and have at least one prize badge to avoid penalty.	Jeon So-min Team Wins; Jeon So-min got Ji Suk-jin's navigation device instead as she went for the 100-inch TV over her team member's prizes. Kim Jong-kook was exempted from the penalty with a game of luck. Ji Suk-jin and Lee Kwang-soo, who had no gift badges received the red whipped cream penalty.
490	February 16, 2020 (February 3, 2020)	RM Countdown (런닝 카운트 다운)	Heo Kyung-hwan; Kang Han-na	SBS Broadcasting Center (Mok-dong, Yangcheon District, Seoul)	No teams		Eliminate others to gain time and be the last one standing	Kim Jong-Kook Wins; Kim Jong-kook received a Korean Beef set, which was given to Haha to fulfill a promise.
491	February 23, 2020 (February 3 & 10, 2020)	RM Countdown (런닝 카운트 다운)	Heo Kyung-hwan; Kang Han-na	SBS Broadcasting Center (Mok-dong, Yangcheon District, Seoul)	No teams		Eliminate others to gain time and be the last one standing	Kim Jong-Kook Wins; Kim Jong-kook received a Korean Beef set, which was given to Haha to fulfill a promise.
491	February 23, 2020 (February 3 & 10, 2020)	Decision! One Hundred (Bag) (결정!백 (Bag))	Bae Jong-ok; Shin Hye-sun	Seokyeong University (Jeongneung-dong, Seongbuk District, Seoul)	Bae Jong-ok Team (Bae Jong-ok, Yoo Jae-suk, Haha, Ji Suk-jin, Jeon So-min)	Shin Hye-sun Team (Shin Hye-sun, Kim Jong-kook, Lee Kwang-soo, Song Ji-hyo, Yang Se-chan)	Be in the Top 2 with the most money while without placing the bottom two with the least money	Ji Suk-jin and Bae Jong-ok Wins; Ji Suk-jin and Bae Jong-ok each received a "R" ring, which Ji Suk-jin gave the ring to Shin Hye-sun. Kim Jong-kook and Jeon So-min, who are the bottom two received the red whipped cream penalty.
492	March 1, 2020 (February 10, 2020)	Decision! One Hundred (Bag) (결정!백 (Bag))	Bae Jong-ok; Shin Hye-sun	Seokyeong University (Jeongneung-dong, Seongbuk District, Seoul)	Bae Jong-ok Team (Bae Jong-ok, Yoo Jae-suk, Haha, Ji Suk-jin, Jeon So-min)	Shin Hye-sun Team (Shin Hye-sun, Kim Jong-kook, Lee Kwang-soo, Song Ji-hyo, Yang Se-chan)	Be in the Top 2 with the most money while without placing the bottom two with the least money	Ji Suk-jin and Bae Jong-ok Wins; Ji Suk-jin and Bae Jong-ok each received a "R" ring, which Ji Suk-jin gave the ring to Shin Hye-sun. Kim Jong-kook and Jeon So-min, who are the bottom two received the red whipped cream penalty.
493 (Note: PD Jung Chul-min's last filming episode.) (Note: Lee Kwang-soo did not participate in this episode due to an accident.)	March 8, 2020 (February 18, 2020)	Bury and Throw in Double (묻고 더블로 던져)	Kang Tae-oh (5urprise); Kim Na-hee; Lee Na-eun (April); Yura	SBS Broadcasting Center (Mok-dong, Yangcheon District, Seoul)	Blue Team (Yoo Jae-suk, Kim Na-hee); Light Green Team (Haha); Lake Blue Team (Ji Suk-jin, Song Ji-hyo); Pink Team (Kim Jong-kook, Lee Na-eun); Orange Team (Jeon So-min, Kang Tae-oh); Green Team (Yang Se-chan, Yura)		Have the most money at the end of the race	Green Team Wins; Yang Se-chan and Yura each received a korean beef set. Ji Suk-jin and Song Ji-hyo received the green whipped cream penalty.
494 (Note: Junior PD Choi Bo-pil's first filming episode.)	March 15, 2020 (March 2, 2020)	RM MT (런닝 MT)	Im Soo-hyang; Jo Byung-gyu	Danurigol Theme Park (Cheoin District, Yongin, Gyeonggi Province)	No teams		Be in the Top 3 with the most "R" coin while without placing last with the least "R" coin	Kim Jong-kook, Jeon So-min and Im Soo-hyang Wins; Through a random lucky draw, Kim Jong-kook receives no prizes, Jeon So-min received an air fryer and Im Soo-hyang received all the members signed nametags. Ji Suk-jin will not wear a microphone as a penalty for tomorrow (next episode) filming opening.
495 (Note: Lee Kwang-soo returns beginning this episode.)	March 22, 2020 (March 3, 2020)	Protect your mom: Another ugly rice cake! (엄마를 지켜라－미운 놈 떡 하나 더!) (Note: Starting this episode, Running Man removed the red box indicating the episode title seen under the series's logo.)	Hwang Young-hee; Kang Daniel; Lee Il-hwa; Park Mi-sun	Salimchae Korean House (Songchon-dong, Paju, Gyeonggi Province)	Lee Il-hwa Team (Lee Il-hwa, Yoo Jae-suk, Ji Suk-jin, Yang Se-chan); Park Mi-sun Team (Park Mi-sun, Haha, Kim Jong-kook, Song Ji-hyo); Hwang Young-hee Team (Hwang Young-hee, Lee Kwang-soo, Jeon So-min, Kang Daniel)		Have the lightest long rice cake while without having the heaviest long rice cake at the end of the race to avoid penalty	Park Mi-sun Team Wins; Through a random lucky draw, Park Mi-sun failed to receive any prizes. Jeon So-min, who has the heaviest long rice cake received water slap on her face by Lee Il-hwa and Park Mi-sun as a penalty. Lee Kwang-soo received a water slap by mistake.
496	March 29, 2020 (March 9, 2020)	Idol VS Running Man: Center style (아이들 VS 런닝맨－센터의 풍격)	Lee Do-hyun; Ong Seong-woo; Seo Ji-hoon; Zico (Block B)	SBS Tanhyeon-dong Production Center (Ilsanseo District, Goyang, Gyeonggi Province)	Entertainers (Yoo Jae-suk, Haha, Ji Suk-jin, Kim Jong-kook, Song Ji-hyo, Jeon So-min)	Lee Kwang-soo's Idols (Lee Kwang-soo, Yang Se-chan, Lee Do-hyun, Ong Seung-woo, Seo Ji-hoon, Zico)	Have the most "R" coins in the Captain's possession at the end of the race	Entertainers Wins; As Yoo Jae-suk, Kim Jong-kook and Jeon So-min placed in the top 2 with the most "R" coins and Ji Suk-jin is the Captain for the team, they got to choose a prize through a random lucky draw. Yoo Jae-suk received Lee Kwang-soo's life-size cardboard cut-out, Ji Suk-jin received an air fryer, Kim Jong-kook failed to receive any prizes and Jeon So-min received all the members-signed nametag. As Lee Kwang-soo, the captain of Lee Kwang-soo's Idols along with Lee Do-hyun and Zico have the least "R" coins in the team, they each received a forehead slap from Yoo Jae-suk and Lee Kwang-soo as a penalty.
497	April 5, 2020 (March 17, 2020)	Unknown face race: Hey, you also know (아무도 모르는 눈치 레이스－야, 너두 알수 있어!)	Hong Hyun-hee; Kim Ji-min	SBS Prism Tower (Sangam-dong, Mapo District, Seoul)	No teams		Be in the Top 2 with the most "R" coin at the end of the race	Yoo Jae-suk and Ji Suk-jin Wins; Through a random lucky draw, Yoo Jae-suk failed to receive any prizes, while Ji Suk-jin received a massage by Kim Jong-kook.
497	April 5, 2020 (March 17, 2020)	Saw angel and devil: Devil's Whisper (천사와 악마를 보았다－악마의 속삭임)	Ahn Bo-hyun; Ji Yi-soo; Lee Joo-young; Song Jin-woo	Yongma Land (Mangu-dong, Jungnang District, Seoul	Survival Game; Ahn Bo-hyun Team (Ahn Bo-hyun, Yoo Jae-suk, Haha); Ji Yi-soo Team (Ji Yi-soo, Ji Suk-jin, Lee Kwang-soo); Lee Joo-young Team (Lee Joo-young, Jeon So-min, Yang Se-chan); Song Jin-woo Team (Song Jin-woo, Kim Jong-kook, Song Ji-hyo); Water Gun Elimination; Ahn Bo-hyun Team (Ahn Bo-hyun, Haha, Yang Se-chan); Ji Yi-soo Team (Ji Yi-soo, Ji Suk-jin, Jeon So-min); Lee Joo-young Team (Lee Joo-young, Yoo Jae-suk, Lee Kwang-soo); Song Jin-woo Team (Song Jin-woo, Kim Jong-kook, Song Ji-hyo); Final Exchange; Ahn Bo-hyun Team (Ahn Bo-hyun, Kim Jong-kook, Yang Se-chan); Ji Yi-soo Team (Ji Yi-soo, Yoo Jae-suk, Jeon So-min); Lee Joo-young Team (Lee Joo-young, Ji Suk-jin, Lee Kwang-soo); Song Jin-woo Team (Song Jin-woo, Haha, Song Ji-hyo)	Devils (Yoo Jae-suk, Haha, Lee Kwang-soo) (Note: The Devils must not be in the same team at the end of the race, otherwise, they will receive the penalty.)	Place in either the first or second place in games to earn the chance to switch teammates without having 1 Devil in order to receive a prize or without having 2 Devils to avoid penalty	Devils and Ahn Bo-hyun Team Wins; Through a random lucky draw, Yoo Jae-suk failed to receive any prizes, Haha received a PC notebook, Lee Kwang-soo received an Airpod, and Kim Jong-kook, Yang Se-chan and Ahn Bo-hyun received a Korean beef set, a bluetooth speaker and an iPad respectively.
498 (Note: Jeon So-min only participated in the opening mission and left early to go to the hospital.)	April 12, 2020 (March 30, 2020)	Saw angel and devil: Devil's Whisper (천사와 악마를 보았다－악마의 속삭임)	Ahn Bo-hyun; Ji Yi-soo; Lee Joo-young; Song Jin-woo	Yongma Land (Mangu-dong, Jungnang District, Seoul		Devils (Yoo Jae-suk, Haha, Lee Kwang-soo)	Place in either the first or second place in games to earn the chance to switch teammates without having 1 Devil in order to receive a prize or without having 2 Devils to avoid penalty	Devils and Ahn Bo-hyun Team Wins; Through a random lucky draw, Yoo Jae-suk failed to receive any prizes, Haha received a PC notebook, Lee Kwang-soo received an Airpod, and Kim Jong-kook, Yang Se-chan and Ahn Bo-hyun received a Korean beef set, a bluetooth speaker and an iPad respectively.
499 (Note: Jeon So-min did not participate in this episode due to a fatigue.)	April 19, 2020 (March 31, 2020)	Seniority Race: Running Man Class (연차 서열 선후배 레이스－런닝맨 클라쓰)	Hong Jin-young; Jo Se-ho; Lee Do-hyun; Noh Sa-yeon; Rowoon (SF9)	SBS Tanhyeon-dong Production Center (Ilsanseo District, Goyang, Gyeonggi Province)	Comedian Team (Yoo Jae-suk, Ji Suk-jin, Yang Se-chan, Jo Se-ho); Singer Team (Haha, Kim Jong-kook, Hong Jin-young, Noh Sa-yeon); Actor Team (Lee Kwang-soo, Song Ji-hyo, Lee Do-hyun, Rowoon)	Spy Team (Yoo Jae-suk, Kim Jong-kook, Lee Do-hyun)	Mission Team's mission Identify and apprehend at least 2 spies out of 3, and be the team with the most prize sticks at the end of the race Spy Team's mission Stamp other members' prize sticks and be the team with the most prize sticks at the end of the race	Spy Team Wins; Yoo Jae-suk, Kim Jong-kook and Lee Do-hyun got 3 chances each to pick a random prize. Yoo Jae-suk received a custom sequin pillow with Ji Suk-jin face on it and a massage from Kim Jong-kook, Kim Jong-kook received a 10-dollar gift card while Lee Do-hyun received a pack of premium wet wipes and a gold bar.
500 (Note: 500th episode special.) (Note: Brief appearance by Jeon So-min through the phone.)	April 26, 2020 (April 13, 2020)	Episode 500: Greedy Camping Race - Do you eat and run? (500회: 욕심쟁이 캠핑 레이스－밥은 먹고 달리냐?)	Choi Yoo-jung (Weki Meki); Chungha; Mijoo (Lovelyz); Park Cho-rong; Yoon Bo-mi (Apink)	The Park Twelve (Seo-myeon, Hongcheon County, Gangwon Province)	Grey Team (Yoo Jae-suk, Choi Yoo-jung); White Team (Haha, Yoon Bo-mi); Yellow Team (Ji Suk-jin, Park Cho-rong); Black Team (Kim Jong-kook, Mijoo); Blue Team (Lee Kwang-soo, Chungha); Red Team (Song Ji-hyo, Yang Se-chan)	Greedy Ghost (Jeon So-min)	Collect hints to identify and eliminate the Greedy Ghost before she eliminates all the members	Red Team Wins; Song Ji-hyo received an Airpod and Yang Se-chan received a flower bouquet and an invitation to Jeon So-min's residence, in which he must pay her a visit and take a photo together.
501	May 3, 2020 (April 14, 2020)	The 1st Running Man Quiz Strongest Person War (제1회 런닝맨 퀴즈 최강자전)	Ha Yeon-joo; Kwak Si-yang; Lee Yi-kyung; Park Hyo-joo	SBS Tanhyeon-dong Production Center (Ilsanseo District, Goyang, Gyeonggi Province)	Participants (Yoo Jae-suk, Haha, Ji Suk-jin, Kim Jong-kook, Yang Se-chan, Ha Yeon-joo, Kwak Si-yang, Lee Yi-kyung)	Illegal Participants (Lee Kwang-soo, Song Ji-hyo, Park Hyo-joo)	Participants's mission Correctly identify and apprehend (Note: Illegal Participants can be apprehended after each round of quiz by a detective who is placed 6th the round before.) at least 2 Illegal Participants and be in the top 5 at the end of the race to receive a prize Illegal Participants's mission Have at least 2 Illegal Participants in the top 5 at the end of the race while without getting apprehended	Participants Wins; Participants who are in the top 5 apart from the Illegal Participants received a prize according to their ranking. Yoo Jae-suk received a Korean Beef set, Ha Yeon-joo received a Korean Pork set, Kim Jong-kook received a bluetooth speaker while Yang Se-chan and Ji Suk-jin each received a box of candles. Final Standings: Rank / Player; 1 / Song Ji-hyo; 2 / Yoo Jae-suk; 3 / Park Hyo-joo; 4 / Ha Yeon-joo; 5 / Kim Jong-kook; 6 / Yang Se-chan; 7 / Ji Suk-jin; 7 / Lee Kwang-soo; 9 / Haha; 9 / Kwak Si-yang; 9 / Lee Yi-kyung
502 (Note: Kim Jong-kook's birthday special.)	May 10, 2020 (April 20, 2020)	Jong-kook's Day: The hero on the mountain tiger's birthday party (종국's Day－산중호걸 호랑님의 생일잔치)	Jun Hyo-seong; Mingyu (SEVENTEEN)	SBS Prism Tower (Sangam-dong, Mapo District, Seoul)	Mission Team (Yoo Jae-suk, Haha, Ji Suk-jin, Lee Kwang-soo, Song Ji-hyo, Yang Se-chan, Jun Hyo-seong, Mingyu)	Birthday Boy (Kim Jong-kook)	Birthday Boy's mission Correctly identify the hidden missions given to the Mission Team in order to receive roulette spins based on the number of correct guesses Mission Team's mission Carry out hidden missions secretly on Birthday Boy without being discovered to gain Running Balls that can be given to other members and without getting picked by the Running Ball machine to pay for the prizes	Birthday Boy, Yoo Jae-suk, Haha, Lee Kwang-soo, Song Ji-hyo, Jun Hyo-seong and Mingyu Wins; Kim Jong-kook received a health tonic and a laptop. Ji Suk-jin and Yang Se-chan were chosen to pay for the tonic and laptop respectively.
503 (Note: Jeon So-min briefly appeared during this episode.)	May 17, 2020 (April 28, 2020)	Protecting Event Fee Race: The World of Domination (행사비 사수 레이스－독식의 세계)	Ahn Ji-young (Bolbbalgan4); BewhY; Hyojung (Oh My Girl); Jessi; Lee Jin-hyuk (UP10TION)	SBS Tanhyeon-dong Production Center (Ilsanseo District, Goyang, Gyeonggi Province)	Hip Hop Team (Yoo Jae-suk, Lee Kwang-soo, BewhY, Jessi); Indie Team (Haha, Song Ji-hyo, Yang Se-chan, Ahn Ji-young); Idol Team (Ji Suk-jin, Kim Jong-kook, Hyojung, Lee Jin-hyuk)		Be in the Top 3 with the most money and without placing the bottom two with the least money	Ji Suk-jin, Kim Jong-kook and Song Ji-hyo Wins; Ji Suk-jin received a Korean Beef set, Song Ji-hyo received a Korean Pork set and Kim Jong-kook received a box of Vitamins. Yoo Jae-suk and Jessi, who placed in the bottom two, were thrown with water balloons by the other members and guests as penalty. Final Standings: Rank / Player; 1 / Ji Suk-jin; 2 / Song Ji-hyo; 3 / Kim Jong-kook; 4 / Haha; 4 / Ahn Ji-young; 6 / Yang Se-chan; 7 / Lee Kwang-soo; 8 / Hyojung; 9 / Lee Jin-hyuk; 10 / BewhY; 11 / Yoo Jae-suk; 12 / Jessi
504	May 24, 2020 (May 11, 2020)	At the crossroads of choice: Too Much Dilemma (선택의 기로에 선 그들－투 머치 딜레마)	Kim Jae-kyung (Rainbow); Kim Min-kyu; Shim Eun-woo	SBS Prism Tower (Sangam-dong, Mapo District, Seoul)	Shim Eun-woo Team (Shim Eun-woo, Yoo Jae-suk, Haha, Lee Kwang-soo, Yang Se-chan)	Kim Min-kyu Team (Kim Min-kyu, Ji Suk-jin, Kim Jong-kook, Song Ji-hyo, Kim Jae-kyung)	Retain the most coins and deposit more than the other team to avoid the penalty	Kim Min-kyu Team Wins; Kim Jae-kyung, who had the most coins, received AirPods, and Ji Suk-jin, who finished second, (Note: Kim Min-kyu also finished the race with the same number of coins as Ji Suk-jin but lost in the rock paper scissors game to determine the prize winner.) received a portable car fridge. Haha and Lee Kwang-soo, who placed in the bottom 2 of the losing team, must bathe in a container of ice water until the filming ends as a penalty.
505 (Note: Jeon So-min returns beginning this episode.) (Note: Special appearance by Korean Fitness Youtuber of Physical Gallery Kim Gye-ran.)	May 31, 2020 (May 12, 2020)	Eliminating Intruders: The Secret of the Traditional Village (아웃되는 침입자－구전마을의 비밀)	No guests	Lastella Pension (Songhae-myeon, Ganghwa County, Incheon)	Running Man	Culprit (Scarecrow (Note: Kim Gye-ran took on the role of the Scarecrow to eliminate the members.))	Uncover the mystery of Gujeon village and find a way to eliminate the Culprit	Haha Wins; Haha received the Immortal Heart jewel.
506	June 7, 2020 (May 18, 2020)	Together with Twice: The Team Leaders of Running Man (트와이스와 함께하는－런닝맨의 팀장들)	Nayeon; Jeongyeon; Momo; Sana; Jihyo; Mina; Dahyun; Chaeyoung; Tzuyu (Twice)	SBS Tanhyeon-dong Production Center (Ilsanseo District, Goyang, Gyeonggi Province)	White Team (Yoo Jae-suk, Yang Se-chan, Dahyun, Tzuyu); Purple Team (Haha, Song Ji-hyo, Chaeyoung, Mina, Momo); Grey Team (Ji Suk-jin, Kim Jong-kook, Jihyo, Sana); Orange Team (Lee Kwang-soo, Jeon So-min, Jeongyeon, Nayeon)		Be in the top 5 with the most money without placing the bottom three with the least money to avoid penalty	White Team and Ji Suk-jin Wins; Yang Se-chan, Yoo Jae-suk, Tzuyu, Dahyun and Ji Suk-jin, who placed in the top 5, received a wine cooler, portable car fridge, air circulator, hand-held fan and paper fan respectively. Lee Kwang-soo, Jeon So-min and Haha who placed in the bottom 3, received the shredded paper, ink water and water shower penalty respectively. Final Standings: Rank / Player / Money (₩ '000); 1 / Yang Se-chan / 340; 2 / Yoo Jae-suk / 320; 3 / Tzuyu / 310; 4 / Dahyun / 300; 5 / Ji Suk-jin / 270; 6 / Jihyo / 100; 6 / Sana / 100; 8 / Mina / 60; 8 / Nayeon / 60; 10 / Chaeyoung / 50; 11 / Kim Jong-kook / 40; 11 / Song Ji-hyo / 40; 13 / Jeongyeon / 30; 14 / Momo / (160); 15 / Lee Kwang-soo / (170); 16 / Jeon So-min / (200); 17 / Haha / (290)
507	June 14, 2020 (May 25, 2020)	Concealed Broker Race: Convenience Store Hot Items (은밀한 브로커 레이스－편의점 핫템이)	Do Sang-woo; Han Sun-hwa; Ji Chang-wook; Kim You-jung	Four-Season Sledding Slope (Bogae-myeon, Anseong, Gyeonggi Province)	Kim You-jung Team (Kim You-jung, Yoo Jae-suk, Ji Suk-jin); Han Sun-hwa Team (Han Sun-hwa, Haha, Yang Se-chan); Do Sang-woo Team (Do Sang-woo, Kim Jong-kook, Jeon So-min); Ji Chang-wook Team (Ji Chang-wook, Lee Kwang-soo, Song Ji-hyo)	Brokers (Lee Kwang-soo, Ji Chang-wook)	Be in the top 2 teams with the highest total items score	Kim You-jung Team and Han Sun-hwa Team Wins; They received a ₩50,000 shopping coupon and 10 of the 15 most popular convenience store items. Prizes: Rank / Items; 1 / Cup of ice; 2 / Banana-flavoured milk; 3 / Hangover drink; 4 / Bottled water (2ℓ); 5 / Bottled water (500mℓ); 6 / Lighter; 7 / Vitamin drink; 8 / Cup noodles; 9 / Lollipop; 10 / Instant noodles; 11 / Coca-Cola; 12 / Canned coffee; 13 / White milk; 14 / Boiled eggs; 15 / Chocolate milk
508	June 21, 2020 (June 8, 2020)	Running Man Loyalty Race: Witty Sharing Life (런닝맨 의리 레이스－슬기로운 나눔생활)	No guests	SBS Broadcasting Center (Mok-dong, Yangcheon District, Seoul)	No teams		Buy the penalty exemption card before all the games are finished to avoid the penalty	No Winners; All members except Kim Jong-kook and Jeon So-min received breaking gourd penalty.
509	June 28, 2020 (June 9, 2020)	The Super-powers School Race: The Super-powers War: Endgame (초능력 학교 레이스－초능력 전: 엔드 게임)	Kang Han-na; Lee Sang-yeob	SBS Tanhyeon-dong Production Center (Ilsanseo District, Goyang, Gyeonggi Province)	Mentor — Mentee (Yoo Jae-suk — Kang Han-na) (Haha — Lee Sang-yeob) (Kim Jong-kook — Jeon So-min) (Lee Kwang-soo — Ji Suk-jin) (Song Ji-hyo — Yang Se-chan)	Superpower School Team (Yoo Jae-suk, Haha, Ji Suk-jin, Lee Kwang-soo, Song Ji-hyo, Jeon So-min, Yang Se-chan, Kang Han-na, Lee Sang-yeob); Human Intruder (Kim Jong-kook)	Superpower School Team's mission Eliminate the Human Intruder; Human Intruder's mission Eliminate all students of the Superpower School	Superpower School Team Wins; Kim Jong-kook randomly chose Kaonashi as his punishment costume to dress up as in the ending of episode 511 on a live broadcast on July 12, 2020.
510	July 5, 2020 (June 22, 2020)	Find the secret of reincarnation: Reincarnation camp 2020 (환생의 비밀을 찾아라－2020환생 캠프)	Jo Se-ho; Lee Do-hyun; Sunmi; Zico (Block B)	R401 Discovery Park (Gangsang-myeon, Yangpyeong County, Gyeonggi Province)	My Glorious Past Envelopes Me; Lee Do-hyun Team (Lee Do-hyun, Yoo Jae-suk, Haha); Jo Se-ho Team (Jo Se-ho, Ji Suk-jin, Kim Jong-kook); Zico Team (Zico, Lee Kwang-soo, Jeon So-min); Sunmi Team (Sunmi, Song Ji-hyo, Yang Se-chan)	Final Mission; Human Team (Yoo Jae-suk, Zico (Note: Zico is the Human Antibody who is immune to zombie infection.)); Parent Zombie (Song Ji-hyo); Zombies (Note: Everyone began the race as human except for Jeon So-min, who was infected by the Parent Zombie beforehand.) Haha (Human —> Low-class) Ji Suk-jin (Human —> Low-class) Kim Jong-kook (Human —> High-class —> Low-class) Lee Kwang-soo (Human —> High-class —> Low-class) Jeon So-min (High-class) Yang Se-chan (Human —> High-class —> Low-class) Jo Se-ho (Human —> Low-class) Lee Do-hyun (Human —> Low-class) Sunmi (Human —> Low-class)	Human Team's mission Identify Parent Zombie and ensure that not it but the Human Antibody gets on the ambulance at the end of the race. Infected Humans are to find and take the vaccine within 10 minutes of infection to be cured and retain human status. Parent Zombie's mission Get revenge on other members for past grudges by surviving till the end of the race and leave on the ambulance OR identify and eliminate the Human Antibody. Zombies' mission High-class and Low-class zombies assist Parent Zombie in eliminating Human Team by stealing items touched by Human Team members and removing their nametags respectively.	Parent Zombie and Zombies Wins; Yoo Jae-suk received dressing up in costume penalty with the last episode loser Kim Jong-kook in the ending of episode 511 on a live broadcast on July 12, 2020 together.
511 (Note: 10th Anniversary Special.)	July 12, 2020 (June 23, 2020 & Live Broadcasting)	10-Year Anniversary Special Live Broadcasting: The Blame Running Man's Provocation (10주년 특집 생방송－괴도 런닝맨의 도발)	No guests	SBS Tanhyeon-dong Production Center (Ilsanseo District, Goyang, Gyeonggi Province)	Running Man (Yoo Jae-suk, Haha, Ji Suk-jin, Kim Jong-kook, Song Ji-hyo, Jeon So-min)	Thieves (Lee Kwang-soo, Yang Se-chan)	Running Man Team's mission Identify and arrest the two Thieves; Thieves' mission Steal as many gold bars from CEO Big Nose's three safe boxes and move them to the thieves' safe box without being caught by the Running Man Team	Thieves Wins; Yoo Jae-suk, Haha, Kim Jong-kook and Song Ji-hyo received the 10th anniversary mud bath penalty. Lee Kwang-soo was exempted from the penalty despite being among the top 4 suspicious members voted by the viewers as he won the race, so Song Ji-hyo, who was voted fifth received the penalty in his place.
512	July 19, 2020 (July 6, 2020)	The 1st Tazza Association Chairman Election: The War of the Veterans (제1회 타짜 힙회장 선거－꾼들의 전쟁)	No guests	TBC	No teams		Collect the largest amount of caramel by the end of the race to have a greater advantage in the following episode, with every caramel collected converted to ₩100.	Race continues in the following episode. Final Standings: Rank / Player / Caramel; 1 / Kim Jong-kook / 68; 2 / Ji Suk-jin / 54; 2 / Haha / 54; 4 / Lee Kwang-soo / 49; 5 / Yang Se-chan / 48; 6 / Jeon So-min / 13; 7 / Song Ji-hyo / 11; 8 / Yoo Jae-suk / 3
513	July 26, 2020 (July 7, 2020)	Capitalism Partner Race: Don't Worry Be Happy (자본주의 짝꿍 레이스－돈 워리 비 해피)	Jang Won-young (Iz*One); Kim Do-yeon (Weki Meki); Kim Dong-jun (ZE:A); Lee Mi-joo (Lovelyz); Soyou; Yuqi ((G)I-dle)	SBS Tanhyeon-dong Production Center (Ilsanseo District, Goyang, Gyeonggi Province)	Pink Team (Yoo Jae-suk, Yuqi); Lake Green Team (Haha, Lee Mi-joo); Red Team (Ji Suk-jin, Song Ji-hyo); Yellow Team (Kim Jong-kook, Soyou); Orange Team (Lee Kwang-soo, Jang Won-young); White Team (Jeon So-min, Kim Dong-jun); Purple Team (Yang Se-chan, Kim Do-yeon)		Be in the top 2 with the highest amount of money at the end of the race	Yellow and Pink Teams Wins; Kim Jong-kook & Soyou received the sweet corn set, sweeping robot and summer bedding. Yoo Jae-suk & Yuqi chose to receive the summer bedding. White Team, who had the least money, must lie down on the starch pool during the entire closing segment as a penalty.
514	August 2, 2020 (July 20, 2020)	Find My Family Race: Little Sister Can't Be Stopped (가족찾기 레이스－여동생은 못말려)	Jeon So-mi; Jessi; Lee Young-ji; Solar (MAMAMOO)	Kobaco Academy (Gangsang-myeon, Yangpyeong County, Gyeonggi Province)	Jessi Team (Jessi, Yoo Jae-suk, Yang Se-chan); Lee Young-ji Team (Lee Young-ji, Haha, Lee Kwang-soo); Jeon So-mi Team (Jeon So-mi, Ji Suk-jin, Kim Jong-kook); Solar Team (Solar, Song Ji-hyo, Jeon So-min)		Teams' mission Obtain enough academic points to rank in the top 2 to avoid receiving a penalty. Youngest sisters' mission Obtain enough audition points to rank in the top 2 to win a prize, with the first-place finisher also exempted from receiving a penalty.	Jeon So-mi, Lee Young-ji and Solar Team Wins; Jeon So-mi and Lee Young-ji received sound bars as prizes for having the top 2 audition scores. 3rd-ranked Jessi Team's Jessi and 4th-ranked Lee Young-ji Team's Haha and Lee Kwang-soo received the random flour penalty.
515 (Note: Special appearance by Shin Kyu-jin.)	August 9, 2020 (July 21, 2020)	A Two-person Jailbreak Race: I don't know much, but it's my partner (2인조 탈옥 레이스－아는 건 별로 없지만 짝꿍 입니다)	Ha Do-kwon; Ji Seung-hyun; Kim Yong-ji; Kim Young-min	Yongin Dream Park Academy (Giheung District, Yongin, Gyeonggi Province)	Prisoner Team (Yoo Jae-suk, Haha, Kim Jong-kook, Lee Kwang-soo, Song Ji-hyo, Jeon So-min, Yang Se-chan, Ha Do-kwon, Ji Seung-hyun, Kim Yong-ji)	Organizer (Kim Young-min); Boss (Ji Suk-jin)	Prisoner Team's mission Identify and eliminated boss and organizer and escape from prison within a specified time with their partner. Boss and Organizer's mission Escape from prison within a specified time with their partner without eliminating by Prisoner Team.	Kim Jong-kook and Kim Yong-ji Wins; They received the tofu box set and ₩100,000 supermarket shopping coupon, Kim Jong-kook gave all of his prizes to Ha Do-kwon as a form of respect by face him in the race.
516 (Note: Yang Se-chan did not participate in this episode due to do his body check.)	August 16, 2020 (August 3, 2020)	Operation to clean up criminals: Domestic Investigation (범죄자 소탕 작전－국내수사)	Kim Dae-myung; Kim Sang-ho; Kwak Do-won	Daewoong Management Development Institute (Cheoin District, Yongin, Gyeonggi Province)	Civilians (Haha, Kim Jong-kook, Song Ji-hyo, Jeon So-min, Kim Sang-ho, Kwak Do-won); Police Officers (Lee Kwang-soo, Kim Dae-myung)	Criminals (Yoo Jae-suk, Ji Suk-jin)	Police Officers' and Civilians' mission Identify and apprehend both criminals before the police officers are eliminated by criminals. Criminals' mission Identify and eliminate both police officers.	Criminals Wins; Yoo Jae-suk and Ji Suk-jin received 10 pre-sale movie tickets. Kwak Do-won, who is the suspect in this race, chose Kim Dae-myung to brush their teeth with sea salt together with him as a penalty.
517 (Note: Yang Se-chan returned in this episode.)	August 23, 2020 (August 4, 2020)	Link Average Race: Live Without Ending (연결고리 평균치 레이스－끊어야 산다)	No guests	SBS Tanhyeon-dong Production Center (Ilsanseo District, Goyang, Gyeonggi Province)	Put a Sticker on the Edge of a Cliff; Team 1 (Yoo Jae-suk, Haha, Song Ji-hyo, Jeon So-min, Yang Se-chan); Team 2 (Ji Suk-jin); Team 3 (Kim Jong-kook); Team 4 (Lee Kwang-soo); Losing Rock-Paper-Scissors; Team 1 (Yoo Jae-suk, Yang Se-chan); Team 2 (Haha, Song Ji-hyo, Jeon So-min); Team 3 (Ji Suk-jin); Team 4 (Kim Jong-kook); Team 5 (Lee Kwang-soo); Survival Balloon War; Team 1 (Yoo Jae-suk, Yang Se-chan); Team 2 (Haha, Song Ji-hyo, Jeon So-min); Team 3 (Ji Suk-jin, Kim Jong-kook); Team 4 (Lee Kwang-soo)		Without becoming top 2 members with the most penalty balls at the end of the race	Kim Jong-kook Wins; Ji Suk-jin and Lee Kwang-soo, who were the only members with penalty balls, received the penalty to retrieve 28 toy gun bullets while wearing a tether.
518	August 30, 2020 (August 17, 2020)	Brahms Music School Race: Do you like 1 people? (브람스 음악학교 레이스－1인자를 좋아하세요?)	Kim Min-jae; Kim Sung-cheol; Park Eun-bin; Park Ji-hyun	Dong Yang Creativity Center (Ilsandong District, Goyang, Gyeonggi Province)	Brahms Music School Lessons 1 & 2 Min-jae Team (Kim Min-jae, Yoo Jae-suk, Ji Suk-jin, Kim Jong-kook); Eun-bin Team (Park Eun-bin, Haha, Jeon So-min, Kim Sung-cheol); Ji-hyun Team (Park Ji-hyun, Lee Kwang-soo, Song Ji-hyo, Yang Se-chan)		Be the only person with the highest grade	Lee Kwang-soo Wins; Lee Kwang-soo received a turntable. Through a game of luck, Yoo Jae-suk and Jeon So-min squeezed sponges filled with ink on their faces. Final Grades: Rank / Player / Grade; 1 / Kim Sung-cheol / Grade 6; 1 / Park Eun-bin / Grade 6; 2 / Ji Suk-jin / Grade 5; 2 / Kim Jong-kook / Grade 5; 3 / Lee Kwang-soo / Grade 4; 4 / Song Ji-hyo / Grade 3; 4 / Park Ji-hyun / Grade 3; 5 / Yoo Jae-suk / No Grade (eliminated); 5 / Haha / No Grade (eliminated); 5 / Jeon So-min / No Grade (eliminated); 5 / Kim Min-jae / No Grade (eliminated)
519	September 6, 2020 (August 18, 2020)	The Blame Running Man's Provocation: Copycat (괴도 런닝맨의 도발II－모방범)	Pyo Chang-won; Yoon Seok-ho	TBC	Civilian Team (Yoo Jae-suk, Ji Suk-jin, Kim Jong-kook, Lee Kwang-soo, Song Ji-hyo, Yang Se-chan, Pyo Chang-won, Yoon Seok-ho)	Thieves (Haha, Jeon So-min)	Civilian Team's mission Identify and arrest the two Thieves; Thieves' mission Steal as many jewels from the room with real ones and move them to the thieves' briefcase without being caught by Civilian Team	Civilian Team Wins; Pyo Chang-won and Yoon Seok-ho each receive a Korean beef gift set. Haha and Jeon So-min's penalty will be revealed on Episode 521.
520	September 13, 2020 (September 7, 2020)	8 People 8 Colours Race: A Lucky Hobby (8인8색 취향 레이스－럭키한 취미생활)	No guests	SBS Open Hall (Deungchon-dong, Gangseo District, Seoul)	Yodeling Class (Note: The guest teachers of this class are the yodeling professionals Kang Dong-hye and Lee Eun-kyung.); Team 1 (Yoo Jae-suk, Haha, Ji Suk-jin, Song Ji-hyo); Team 2 (Kim Jong-kook, Lee Kwang-soo, Jeon So-min, Yang Se-chan); Dance Class; Brazil Team (Note: The guest teachers of this class is Dance Competition winner and Hula Dance Teacher Che Che.) (Yoo Jae-suk, Haha, Jeon So-min, Yang Se-chan); Hawaii Team (Note: The guest teachers of this class are the Competition winner Samba Dancer Park Ji-woo and his wife Ryu Jin-won also a presentation of dancers Kim Ung-gyeom & Um Hye-ri) (Ji Suk-jin, Kim Jong-kook, Lee Kwang-soo, Song Ji-hyo); A Capella Class (Note: The guest teachers of this class are the capella band EXIT); Team 1 (Yoo Jae-suk, Lee Kwang-soo, Song Ji-hyo, Yang Se-chan); Team 2 (Haha, Ji Suk-jin, Kim Jong-kook, Jeon So-min)		Collect as many lotto tickets from winning missions and winning numbers from becoming the best student in class to increase the probability of earning a prize	Haha Wins; All of the prizes won by the members will be revealed in a future episode.
521	September 20, 2020 (September 15, 2020)	Fashion Choice Race: All or Nothing (운명 선택 레이스—모 아니면 고)	No guests	Danurium Campground (Cheoin District, Yongin, Gyeonggi Province)	No teams		Be in the top 3 with the most chocolate wooden sticks at the end of the race to avoid penalty. (Note: If Jeon So-min or Haha are placed last, both must take the penalty to fullify the punishment given 2 chapters ago saving the second last place)	Yoo Jae-suk, Kim Jong-kook and Yang Se-chan Wins; Kim Jong-kook received a framed photo of the production crew members and won a clothing care machine, Yoo Jae-suk won a tablet PC prize. (Note: As Yoo Jae-suk and Kim Jong-kook won the two most expensive prizes, they swapped with a different prize due to unrealistic prize choices from the production crew.); Yang Se-chan failed to receive any prize. The last two places, Lee Kwang-soo and Jeon So-min must take the penalty, however as Jeon So-min placed last, Kwang-soo avoid the penalty and Haha, who finished second runner-up at the end of the race, lost his qualification as a winner and must make a mask necklace out of beads to fulfil a previous penalty (See Ep. 519).
522	September 27, 2020 (September 21, 2020)	America VS Asia: The King of Trade of This Area (아메리카 VS 아시아－이 구역의 무역왕)	Ailee; Joon Park (g.o.d); Kangnam; Yiren (Everglow)	The Fantagium Shopping Center (Yeongtong District, Suwon, Gyeonggi Province)	America Team (Kim Jong-kook, Haha, Jeon So-min, Ailee, Joon Park); Asia Team (Lee Kwang-soo, Song Ji-hyo, Yang Se-chan, Kangnam, Yiren)	Customs Team (Yoo Jae-suk, Ji Suk-jin)	Without getting last place at the end of the race to avoid penalty	America Team Wins; Yang Se-chan and Kangnam were chosen through a game of luck to receive the zip line roller coaster penalty.
523 (Note: Chuseok Special.)	October 4, 2020 (September 22, 2020)	Holiday Family Race: The Legacy War of Yoo's Family (명절맞이 가족 레이스 - 유가네 유산 전쟁)	No guests	Salimchae Korean House (Songchon-dong, Paju, Gyeonggi Province)	Yoo Jae-suk's family (Yoo Jae-suk, Haha, Lee Kwang-soo); Yoo Jong-kook's family (Kim Jong-kook, Ji Suk-jin, Song Ji-hyo, Jeon So-min, Yang Se-chan)		Be the faster team to finish cooking three sets of jeon by 3 p.m. while having the most remaining eggs within the winning team	Yoo Jae-suk, Haha and Song Ji-hyo Wins (Note: Song Ji-hyo, who had the most remaining eggs, was exempted from the penalty.); Yoo Jae-suk, Haha and Song Ji-hyo each received a Korean beef set . (Note: Yoo Jae-suk give his Korean beef to Lee Kwang-soo as compensation.) Lee Kwang-soo, who had the fewest remaining eggs within Yoo Jae-suk's family, had to make 100 pieces of songpyeon along with Yoo Jong-kook's team. Yoo Jae-suk was chosen by Kim Jong-kook to be penalised instead after using the penalty transfer card he earned in Ep. 511.
524	October 11, 2020 (September 28, 2020)	Find the Original Belief Race: The Precious Mong-Dol Sisters (초심 찾기 레이스－금쪽 같은 멍돌자매)	No guests	Kobaco Academy (Gangsang-myeon, Yangpyeong County, Gyeonggi Province)	Individual Race; Mong-Dol Sisters (Song Ji-hyo, Jeon So-min); Male Members (Yoo Jae-suk, Haha, Ji Suk-jin, Kim Jong-kook, Lee Kwang-soo, Yang Se-chan)		Mong-Dol Sisters' mission: Have the fewest votes to avoid penalty Male Members' mission: Without being in the top 4 with the highest number of bomb badges at the end of the race to avoid penalty	Yoo Jae-suk, Kim Jong-kook & Song Ji-hyo Wins; Song Ji-hyo received a bouquet and a turntable from Kim Jong-kook. Jeon So-min received a bouquet from Yoo Jae-suk, but she won the penalty vote, hence she must dance as an extra in the Blackpink's presentation as punishment in the opening of next episode. Through a roulette of luck, Haha got doused with a bucket of pink paint as a penalty.
525	October 18, 2020 (October 6, 2020)	Blackpink in Running Man: Deliver Us From Probabilities (블랙핑크 in Running Man－다만 확률에서 구하소서)	Jennie; Jisoo; Lisa; Rosé (Blackpink)	SBS Tanhyeon-dong Production Center (Ilsanseo District, Goyang, Gyeonggi Province)	Jennie Team (Jennie, Yoo Jae-suk, Ji Suk-jin, Jeon So-min); Jisoo Team (Jisoo, Haha, Song Ji-hyo, Yang Se-chan); Lisa & Rosé Team (Lisa, Rosé, Kim Jong-kook, Lee Kwang-soo)		Individual mission: Within being in the top 3 with the least rice cakes to receive the prizes and without being in the bottom 3 with most rice cakes at the end of the race to avoid penalty Team mission: Without having the highest accumulated number of discarded rice cakes to avoid penalty	Jisoo Team Wins; Haha, Yang Se-chan and Rosé, who are the top 3 with the least rice cakes each received a cake consisting of rice cakes. Through a game of luck, Yoo Jae-suk and Ji Suk-jin received the black paint and pink paint shower penalty respectively whereas Kim Jong-kook, Jeon So-min, Jennie and Lisa received the confetti shower penalty. Final Individual Results: Rank / Player / Rice Cakes; 1 / Haha / 0; 2 / Yang Se-chan / 1; 2 / Rosé / 1; 4 / Jeon So-min / 2; 5 / Lee Kwang-soo / 3; 5 / Song Ji-hyo / 3; 5 / Jisoo / 3; 8 / Ji Suk-jin / 5; 9 / Jennie / 6; 10 / Yoo Jae-suk / 9; 11 / Lisa / 12; 12 / Kim Jong-kook / 13; Final Team Results: Rank / Team / Discarded Rice Cakes; 1 / Jisoo / 15; 2 / Lisa & Rosé / 42; 3 / Jennie / 55
526	October 25, 2020 (October 12, 2020)	Big Liar: The Faceless Robber King (꾼 대 꾼：얼굴없는 도굴왕)	Im Won-hee; Lee Je-hoon	R401 Discovery Park (Gangsang-myeon, Yangpyeong County, Gyeonggi Province)	Robbers-turned-Police Officers (Ji Suk-jin, Jeon So-min, Im Won-hee); Police Officers (Yang Se-chan, Lee Je-hoon)	Tomb Robbers (Yoo Jae-suk, Haha, Kim Jong-kook, Song Ji-hyo); Tomb Robbery Association Chairperson (Lee Kwang-soo)	Police Officers' mission: Identify and eliminate the Chairperson; Tomb Robbery Association Chairperson and Tomb Robbers' mission: Eliminate all Police Officers	Tomb Robbery Association Chairperson & Tomb Robbers Wins; Lee Kwang-soo chose Song Ji-hyo to receive tea cup sets. Ji Suk-jin was chosen through a game of luck to receive the water shower penalty.
527 (Note: Jeju Province's Special.)	November 1, 2020 (October 13, 2020)	Jeju-do Special Part.1: The Wind, Girls, Stone and Bomb (제주도 특집 제1탄－바람, 여자, 돌 그리고 폭탄)	Choi Yeo-jin; Han Ji-eun; Lee Joo-bin; So Yi-hyun	Buksu-gu Plaza (Ildo-dong, Jeju-si, Jeju Province)	Yeo-jin Team (Choi Yeo-jin, Yoo Jae-suk, Lee Kwang-soo); Yi-hyun Team (So Yi-hyun, Haha, Kim Jong-kook); Ji-eun Team (Han Ji-eun, Ji Suk-jin, Song Ji-hyo); Joo-bin Team (Lee Joo-bin, Jeon So-min, Yang Se-chan)		Collect all 3 cards symbolizing Samdado to win prizes and without having the bomb card at the end of the race to avoid penalty	Joo-bin Team Wins; Lee Joo-bin, Jeon So-min and Yang Se-chan each received a Jeju black pork gift set. As Ji-eun Team have the bomb card at the end of the race, they each received a wet forehead slap from the other team as a penalty.
528 (Note: Brief appearance by Cheon Sung-moon, Jang Hyuk, Jo Se-ho, Kang Jae-joon, and Ji Suk-jin's wife, Ryu Su-jung, through the phone.)	November 8, 2020 (October 19, 2020)	Jeju-do Special Part.2: If caught, poison! Package tour (제주도 특집 제2탄－걸리면 독박! 패키지 여행)	No guests	A'bout Coffee Shop (Nohyeong-dong, Jeju-si, Jeju Province)	Intangible Cultural Heritage Team (Yoo Jae-suk, Ji Suk-jin); Running Superior Team (Haha, Kim Jong-kook); Math Olympiad Team (Lee Kwang-soo, Song Ji-hyo); Newly Married Couple Team (Jeon So-min, Yang Se-chan)		Individual mission Being the top 3 with the most stamps at the end of the race Team mission Without having the least team funds at the end of the race	Intangible Cultural Heritage Team, Kim Jong-kook and Yang Se-chan Wins; All members received gifts bought by Jeon So-min from a duty-free shop. Math Olympiad Team, who has the least team funds at the end of the race, will receive a penalty in the opening of a future episode airing within a month, which was revealed on episode 530. The punishment was dress as french opera singers and make lipsinc to a opera in the opening of the "Penthouse" Race.
529	November 15, 2020 (November 2, 2020)	Finding for Old Shops in Seoul: Old Shops Record (서울의 노포를 찾아라－노포기록)	Hoshi; Mingyu (Seventeen); Kim Nam-joo; Yoon Bo-mi (Apink); Kim Soo-yong; Nam Chang-hee	Some Sevit (Banpo-dong, Seocho District, Seoul)	Suk-jin Team (Ji Suk-jin, Yoo Jae-suk, Kim Soo-yong, Nam Chang-hee); Jong-kook Team (Kim Jong-kook, Haha, Lee Kwang-soo, Kim Nam-joo, Yoon Bo-mi); Ji-hyo Team (Song Ji-hyo, Jeon So-min, Yang Se-chan, Kwon Soon-Young, Mingyu)		Have all team members deduct their age to reach 0 and without remaining as one of the 2 oldest members with their respective teams at the end of the race to avoid penalty.	Suk-jin Team Wins; Suk-jin Team each received a wooden tableware set. Haha and Kim Jong-kook each received forehead slap penalty to remove 15 years whereas Song Ji-hyo and Kwon Soon-Young each received wrist slap penalty to remove 5 years from their remaining ages respectively.
530	November 22, 2020 (November 2 & 9, 2020)	Finding for Old Shops in Seoul: Old Shops Record (서울의 노포를 찾아라－노포기록)	Hoshi; Mingyu (Seventeen); Kim Nam-joo; Yoon Bo-mi (Apink); Kim Soo-yong; Nam Chang-hee	Some Sevit (Banpo-dong, Seocho District, Seoul)	Suk-jin Team (Ji Suk-jin, Yoo Jae-suk, Kim Soo-yong, Nam Chang-hee); Jong-kook Team (Kim Jong-kook, Haha, Lee Kwang-soo, Kim Nam-joo, Yoon Bo-mi); Ji-hyo Team (Song Ji-hyo, Jeon So-min, Yang Se-chan, Kwon Soon-Young, Mingyu)		Have all team members deduct their age to reach 0 and without remaining as one of the 2 oldest members with their respective teams at the end of the race to avoid penalty.	Suk-jin Team Wins; Suk-jin Team each received a wooden tableware set. Haha and Kim Jong-kook each received forehead slap penalty to remove 15 years whereas Song Ji-hyo and Kwon Soon-Young each received wrist slap penalty to remove 5 years from their remaining ages respectively.
530	November 22, 2020 (November 2 & 9, 2020)	Higher Club VS Lower Club: Highly Admired Recruitment! Penthouse (상위클럽 VS 하위클럽－절찬 모집！펜트하우스)	Eugene; Ha Do-kwon; Kim So-yeon; Lee Ji-ah	SBS Tanhyeon-dong Production Center (Ilsanseo District, Goyang, Gyeonggi Province)	No teams		Being the Top 4 to arrive in the penthouse to receive a prize and avoid penalty.	Yoo Jae-suk, Kim Jong-kook, Song Ji-hyo and Yang Se-chan Wins; They each received a korean beef set. Ji Suk-jin and Eugene were chosen through a game of luck to receive the eating shaved ice with foot soaked in ice water penalty.
531	November 29, 2020 (November 9, 2020)	Penthouse Special II: Tenant War (펜트하우스 특집II：입주 전쟁)	Eugene; Ha Do-kwon; Kim So-yeon; Lee Ji-ah	SBS Tanhyeon-dong Production Center (Ilsanseo District, Goyang, Gyeonggi Province)	No teams		Being the Top 4 to arrive in the penthouse to receive a prize and avoid penalty.	Yoo Jae-suk, Kim Jong-kook, Song Ji-hyo and Yang Se-chan Wins; They each received a korean beef set. Ji Suk-jin and Eugene were chosen through a game of luck to receive the eating shaved ice with foot soaked in ice water penalty.
532	December 6, 2020 (November 16, 2020)	Best Friend Special Friendship Race: The 1st Friendship Awards (절친 특집 우정 레이스－제1회 프렌드십 어워즈)	Cha Tae-hyun; Huening Kai; Yeonjun (TXT); Jang Dong-min; Lee Mi-joo (Lovelyz); Yang Dong-geun	Sky Rabbit Coffee Shop (Seogyo-dong, Mapo District, Seoul)	Red Team (Yoo Jae-suk, Lee Kwang-soo); Orange Team (Haha, Ji Suk-jin); Green Team (Kim Jong-kook, Cha Tae-hyun); Yellow Team (Song Ji-hyo, Yang Se-chan); Sky Blue Team (Jeon So-min, Lee Mi-joo); Navy Blue Team (Jang Dong-min, Yang Dong-geun); Purple Team (Yeonjun, Huening Kai)		Being the Top 3 with the highest coins to receive a prize and without being the top 3 with the most penalty badges at the end of the race to avoid penalty.	Sky Blue Team, Navy Blue Team and Purple Team Wins; Jeon So-min and Lee Mi-joo each received a korean beef set, Jang Dong-min and Yang Dong-geun each received a friendship ring and Yeonjun and Huening Kai each received a vitamin box set. Lee Kwang-soo, Jeon So-min and Cha Tae-hyun, who are the Top 3 with the most penalty badges received the persimmon vinegar loyalty game penalty.
533 (Note: Running Sweet Home Special.)	December 13, 2020 (December 7, 2020)	Running Man: Sweet Home (런닝맨：스위트 홈)	Lee Do-hyun; Lee Jin-wook; Lee Si-young; Song Kang	Hongwon Training Institute (Jori-eup, Paju, Gyeonggi Province)	Human Team (Yoo Jae-suk, Haha, Lee Kwang-soo, Song Ji-hyo, Jeon So-min, Yang Se-chan, Lee Do-hyun, Lee Jin-wook, Lee Si-young, Song Kang) (Note: Lee Kwang-soo, Yang Se-chan and Song Kang were become subordinates of Monster after they resurrected from the elimination in Human Team.)	Monsters (Ji Suk-jin, Kim Jong-kook)	Human Team's Mission; Identify and eliminate all of the Monsters to get the password and escape from the building Monsters's Mission; Eliminate all of the Human Team's members	Monsters Wins; Lee Kwang-soo, Lee Jin-wook and Lee Si-young was chosen from a game of luck to receive water slap on their faces as a penalty.
534 (Note: Korean Baseball Special.)	December 20, 2020 (November 30, 2020)	Ryu Hyun-jin X Kim Kwang-hyun: Sparkling Stove League (류현진X김광현－불꽃 스토브리그)	Kim Kwang-hyun; Ryu Hyun-jin	Goyang National Baseball Training Stadium (Ilsanseo District, Goyang, Gyeonggi Province)	Yoo Owner Team (Yoo Jae-suk, Ji Suk-jin, Kim Jong-kook, Jeon So-min, Ryu Hyun-jin); Yang Owner Team (Yang Se-chan, Haha, Song Ji-hyo, Lee Kwang-soo, Kim Kwang-hyun)	Final Mission; Yoo Owner Team (Yoo Jae-suk, Ji Suk-jin, Kim Jong-kook, Song Ji-hyo, Ryu Hyun-jin); Yang Owner Team (Yang Se-chan, Haha, Lee Kwang-soo, Jeon So-min, Kim Kwang-hyun)	Team Owner's Mission; Receive the most money at the end of the race to avoid penalty Athletes's Mission; Being the Top 3 with the most money and without having the least money at the end of the race to avoid penalty	Yoo Owner Team Wins; Song Ji-hyo, Kim Kwang-hyun and Ryu Hyun-jin, who are the Top 3 with the most money each received an abalone set. Jeon So-min and Yang Se-chan, who has the least money at the end of the race and the team owner of the losing team respectively, they all pick up the leftover cones and baseballs after the filming as a penalty.
535	December 27, 2020 (December 14, 2020)	New Year Blues Race: 2020 Year-end Closing (새해전야 레이스－2020 연말결산)	Lee Yeon-hee; Sooyoung (Girls' Generation); Teo Yoo; Yoo Yeon-seok	SBS Tanhyeon-dong Production Center (Ilsanseo District, Goyang, Gyeonggi Province)	Teo Yoo Team (Teo Yoo, Yoo Jae-suk, Haha); Yeon-hee Team (Lee Yeon-hee, Ji Suk-jin, Song Ji-hyo); Sooyoung Team (Sooyoung, Kim Jong-kook, Jeon So-min); Yeon-seok Team (Yoo Yeon-seok, Lee Kwang-soo, Yang Se-chan)		Reach a total of 2020 points or being the Top 2 with the highest team points at the end of the race to receive a prize and without having the least team points to avoid penalty	Teo Yoo Team and Yeon-hee Team Win; They each received the ₩1,000,000 traditional market gift coupon. Yeon-seok Team, who got the least team points, had to make a face print on a sheet of paper with ink as a penalty.

== Viewership ==
Average TV viewership ratings
Ep.	Original broadcast date	Nielsen Korea		TNmS
Ep.	Original broadcast date	Nationwide	Seoul	Nationwide
484	January 5, 2020	—	7.7% (15th)	7.3% (18th)
485	January 12, 2020	6.7% (17th)	6.9% (16th)	7.2% (16th)
486	January 19, 2020	7.5% (17th)	8.0% (15th)	8.1% (16th)
487	January 26, 2020	6.0% (20th)	6.1% (17th)	6.0% (20th)
488	February 2, 2020	—	7.8% (18th)	—
489	February 9, 2020	7.1% (17th)	7.6% (16th)	8.0% (16th)
490	February 16, 2020	—	7.3% (19th)	7.3% (19th)
491	February 23, 2020	—	—	—
492	March 1, 2020	8.1% (16th)	9.1% (13th)	8.1% (17th)
493	March 8, 2020	7.2% (18th)	8.4% (18th)	8.1% (17th)
494	March 15, 2020	7.2% (18th)	7.9% (16th)	8.1% (18th)
495	March 22, 2020	7.0% (17th)	8.1% (16th)	8.5% (17th)
496	March 29, 2020	—	6.6% (20th)	7.8% (19th)
497	April 5, 2020	—	—	7.3% (18th)
498	April 12, 2020	—	7.2% (19th)	7.9% (18th)
499	April 19, 2020	6.5% (18th)	7.0% (18th)	8.1% (16th)
500	April 26, 2020	7.3% (17th)	7.9% (15th)	—
501	May 3, 2020	6.4% (18th)	6.4% (18th)	6.9% (18th)
502	May 10, 2020	—	—	6.8% (18th)
503	May 17, 2020	6.0% (20th)	6.3% (20th)	7.1% (17th)
504	May 24, 2020	—	—	7.0% (19th)
505	May 31, 2020	6.5% (19th)	7.4% (16th)	7.2% (17th)
506	June 7, 2020	6.1% (20th)	6.6% (19th)	6.8% (18th)
507	June 14, 2020	—	6.6% (18th)	7.9% (17th)
508	June 21, 2020	5.8% (19th)	6.5% (19th)	6.2% (19th)
509	June 28, 2020	—	—	—
510	July 5, 2020	—	—	6.5% (19th)
511	July 12, 2020	6.0% (20th)	6.3% (19th)	6.9% (18th)
512	July 19, 2020	—	6.7% (20th)	6.7% (20th)
513	July 26, 2020	—	6.4% (17th)	6.7% (17th)
514	August 2, 2020	6.5% (20th)	7.7% (17th)	7.1% (15th)
515	August 9, 2020	6.2% (20th)	—	7.1% (16th)
516	August 16, 2020	—	—	—
517	August 23, 2020	—	7.0% (20th)	—
518	August 30, 2020	6.4% (19th)	—	—
519	September 6, 2020	—	—	8.0% (17th)
520	September 13, 2020	—	—	6.8% (19th)
521	September 20, 2020	6.5% (16th)	7.0% (16th)	7.4% (16th)
522	September 27, 2020	—	—	6.3% (19th)
523	October 4, 2020	6.3% (18th)	6.4% (18th)	7.2% (17th)
524	October 11, 2020	6.0% (18th)	—	7.2% (18th)
525	October 18, 2020	6.2% (16th)	6.5% (16th)	7.1% (16th)
526	October 25, 2020	6.5% (15th)	6.8% (14th)	6.5% (17th)
527	November 1, 2020	6.2% (19th)	—	7.9% (13th)
528	November 8, 2020	6.6% (15th)	6.7% (15th)	7.5% (13th)
529	November 15, 2020	6.6% (15th)	7.3% (13th)	7.5% (13th)
530	November 22, 2020	6.9% (18th)	7.2% (18th)	9.4% (10th)
531	November 29, 2020	6.6% (18th)	7.0% (16th)	7.4% (16th)
532	December 6, 2020	6.9% (19th)	7.4% (18th)	7.4% (15th)
533	December 13, 2020	6.8% (18th)	—	8.2% (14th)
534	December 20, 2020	7.7% (17th)	8.3% (14th)	5.9% (18th)
535	December 27, 2020	7.2% (20th)	7.1% (20th)	8.1% (15th)
TNmS ratings listed is the highest ratings amongst ratings for each episodes.; "—" denotes episode didn't enter top 20 in Nielsen Korea and TNmS ratings.
