= Dangju-dong =

- Interactive map of Dangju-dong
- Country: South Korea

Area
  - Total: 0.04 km^{2} (0.015 sq mi)

Korean name
- Hangul: 당주동
- Hanja: 唐珠洞
- RR: Dangju-dong
- MR: Tangju-dong

Dangju-dong (Korean: 당주동) is a dong (neighborhood) of Jongno District, Seoul, South Korea. It is a legal dong (법정동 法定洞) administered under its administrative dong (행정동 行政洞), Sajik-dong.

== See also ==
- Administrative divisions of South Korea
