= Cheongpa-dong =

Neighborhood in Seoul, South Korea

Coordinates: 37.545°N 126.970°E

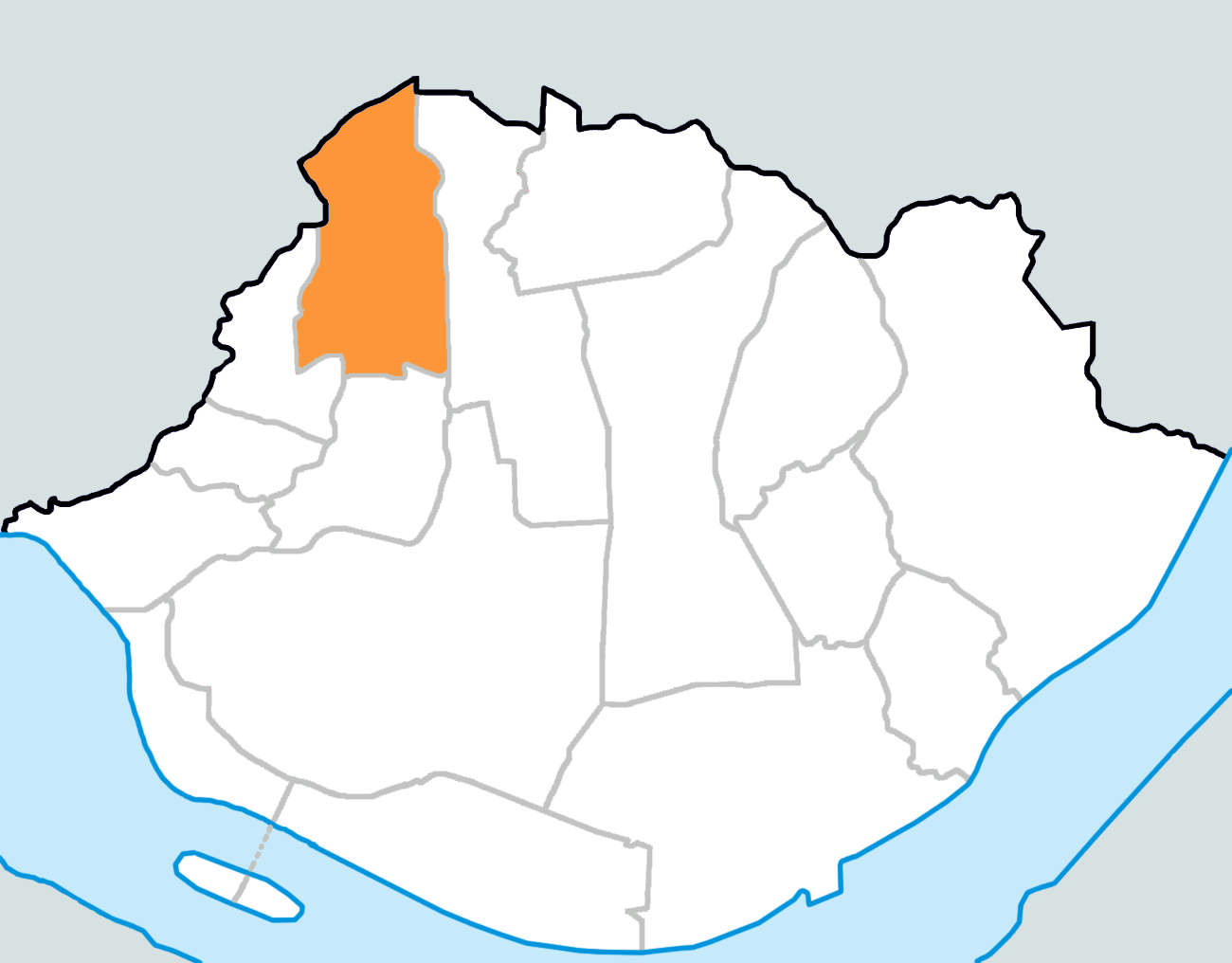
- Country: South Korea

Area
  - Total: 0.91 km^{2} (0.35 sq mi)

Population (2013)
  - Total: 22,760
  - Density: 25,000/km^{2} (65,000/sq mi)

Korean name
- Hangul: 청파동
- Hanja: 靑坡洞
- RR: Cheongpa-dong
- MR: Ch'ŏngp'a-dong

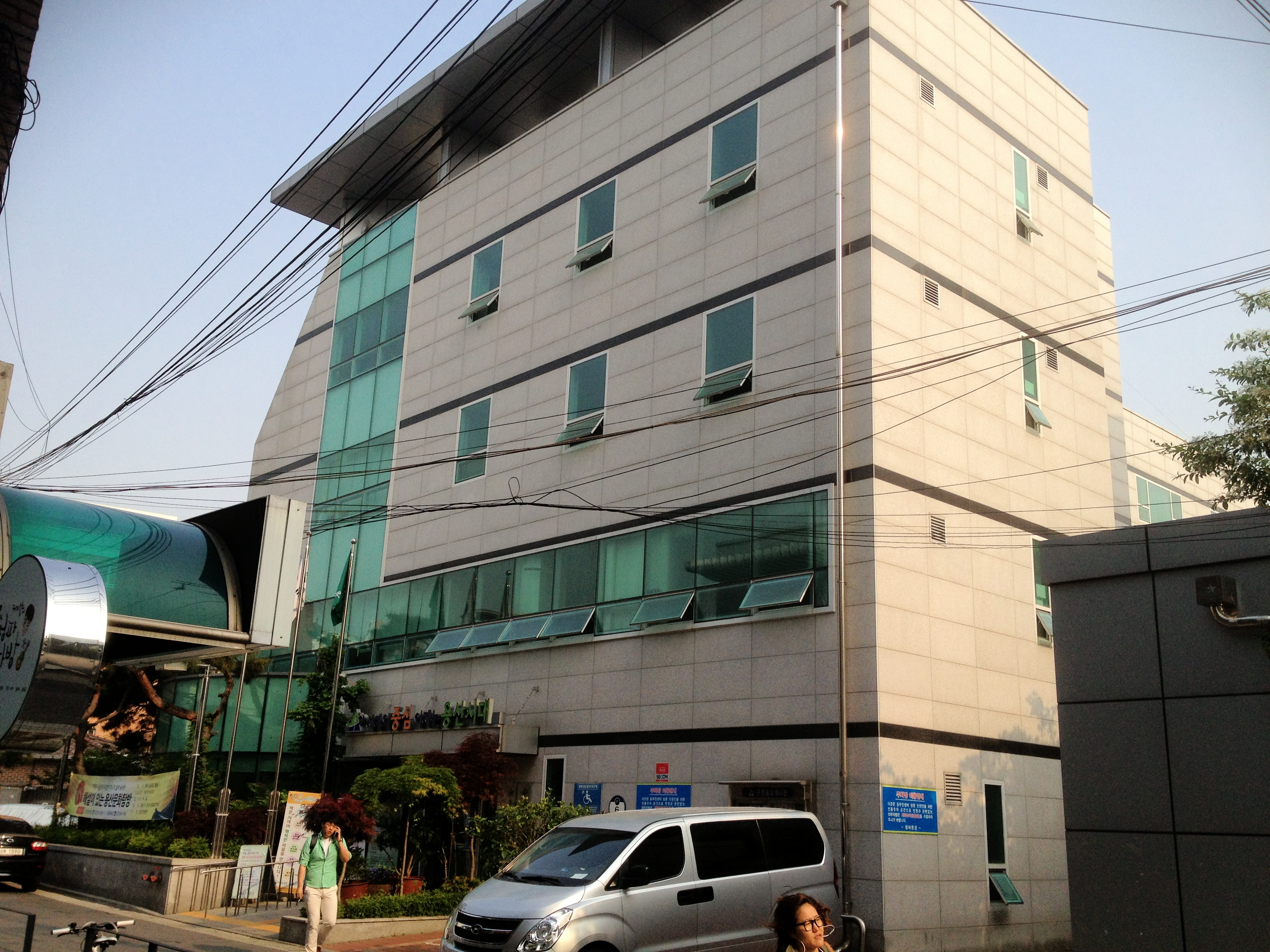
Cheongpa-dong Community Service center

Cheongpa-dong (Korean: 청파동) is a dong (neighborhood) of Yongsan District, Seoul, South Korea.

Cheongpa-dong is a place deeply connected with literature and poets. The most famous is Choi Seung-ja's poem titled 'Do You Remember Cheongpa-dong', and poet Park Joon also released Cheongpa-dong Trilogy.

Additionally, it is also the setting for writer Kim Ho-yeon's novel 'Inconvenient Convenience Store'. And Jeongmilla's 'CheongPa Sonata', which won the Album of the Year at the 2021 Korean Music Awards, is also based on her experiences in Cheongpa-dong.

== Etymology ==
The name Cheongpa (靑坡) is derived from the meaning "blue hill." There are two explanations for its origin. One is that Cheongpa-dong is located near Yeonhwabong, a blue mountain peak, hence the name. The other explanation is that it is derived from the residence of Cheongpa Gigeon, a renowned scholar during the Joseon period, who lived in this area during the reign of King Sejong.

== Education ==
- Cheongpa Elementary School
- Shinkwang Elementary School
- Sunrin Middle School
- Baemoon Middle School
- Sunrin Internet High School
- Shinkwang Women's High School
- Baemoon High School
- Sookmyung Women's University

== Public transportation ==
- The northern part of Cheongpa-dong is served by Seoul Station, while the southern area is closer to Station #427, Sookmyung Women's University on Line 4.

== See also ==
- Administrative divisions of South Korea
