= Sajik-dong, Seoul =

Sajik-dong
- Interactive map of Sajik-dong
- Coordinates: 37°34′27″N 126°58′12″E
- Country: South Korea

Area
  - Total: 1.22 km^{2} (0.47 sq mi)

Population (2001)
  - Total: 8,682
  - Density: 7,120/km^{2} (18,400/sq mi)

Korean name
- Hangul: 사직동
- Hanja: 社稷洞
- RR: Sajik-dong
- MR: Sajik-tong

Sajik-dong (Korean: 사직동) is a dong (neighbourhood) of Jongno District, Seoul, South Korea.

== See also ==
- Administrative divisions of South Korea
