= List of Running Man episodes (2021) =

- No. of episodes: 50

Release
- Original network: SBS
- Original release: January 3 – December 26, 2021

Season chronology
- ← Previous; 2020 Next → 2022

This is a list of episodes of the South Korean variety show Running Man in 2021. The show airs on SBS as part of their Good Sunday lineup.

== Episodes ==
List of episodes (536–585)
Ep.	Airdate (Filming date)	Title	Guest(s)	Landmark	Teams		Mission	Results
536	January 3, 2021 (December 21, 2020)	2021 Tazza Association New Year's Party: The Return of the Veterans (2021 타짜협회 신년회－꾼들의 귀환)	No Guests	Yangpyeong Forest Pension (Danwol-myeon, Yangpyeong County, Gyeonggi Province)	No Teams		Win with the most caramel to receive prizes and without being the Top 3 with the least caramel at the end of the race to avoid penalty	Haha, Kim Jong-kook, Song Ji-hyo, Jeon So-min and Yang Se-chan Wins; Haha, Kim Jong-kook, Song Ji-hyo, Jeon So-min and Yang Se-chan each received an undisclosed amount of traditional market gift coupon. Ji Suk-jin was exempted from the penalty through a game of luck. Yoo Jae-suk and Lee Kwang-soo received water slap on their faces together as a penalty.
537	January 10, 2021 (December 21 & 28, 2020)	2021 Tazza Association New Year's Party: The Return of the Veterans (2021 타짜협회 신년회－꾼들의 귀환)	No Guests	Yangpyeong Forest Pension (Danwol-myeon, Yangpyeong County, Gyeonggi Province)	No Teams		Win with the most caramel to receive prizes and without being the Top 3 with the least caramel at the end of the race to avoid penalty	Haha, Kim Jong-kook, Song Ji-hyo, Jeon So-min and Yang Se-chan Wins; Haha, Kim Jong-kook, Song Ji-hyo, Jeon So-min and Yang Se-chan each received an undisclosed amount of traditional market gift coupon. Ji Suk-jin was exempted from the penalty through a game of luck. Yoo Jae-suk and Lee Kwang-soo received water slap on their faces together as a penalty.
537	January 10, 2021 (December 21 & 28, 2020)	Planning Intention Race: The Rewriting Running Man (기획 의도 레이스－다시 쓰는 런닝맨)	No Guests	Danurigol Theme Park (Cheoin District, Yongin, Gyeonggi Province)	No Teams		Win as many missions to increase the chance of winning on the final roulette	Yoo Jae-suk Wins; Yoo Jae-suk received ₩400,000 worth of gift vouchers and earned the rights to change the production objective and cast comments on RM's official website.
538	January 17, 2021 (December 28, 2020)	Planning Intention Race: The Rewriting Running Man (기획 의도 레이스－다시 쓰는 런닝맨)	No Guests	Danurigol Theme Park (Cheoin District, Yongin, Gyeonggi Province)	No Teams		Win as many missions to increase the chance of winning on the final roulette	Yoo Jae-suk Wins; Yoo Jae-suk received ₩400,000 worth of gift vouchers and earned the rights to change the production objective and cast comments on RM's official website.
539 (Note: Special appearance by Shin Kyu-jin.)	January 24, 2021 (January 11, 2021)	Activity Cost Shooter Race: Burning 18 Again (활동비 사수 레이스－불타는 18 어게인)	Defconn; Kim Bo-sung	Hanul Youth Centre (Hwalcho-dong, Hwaseong, Gyeonggi)	Student Guidance Department (Yoo Jae-suk, Lee Kwang-soo, Kim Bo-sung); Band Department (Haha, Song Ji-hyo, Yang Se-chan); Dance Department (Ji Suk-jin, Kim Jong-kook, Jeon So-min, Defconn)		Team Mission; Have the highest amount of team funds at the end of the race to receive a prize Individual Mission; Without being the bottom 3 with the highest penalty points to avoid penalty	Yoo Jae-suk, Haha, Song Ji-hyo, Jeon So-min, Yang Se-chan, Defconn and Kim Bo-sung Wins; Dance Department received ₩4,000,000 worth of gift vouchers. Ji Suk-jin, Kim Jong-kook and Lee Kwang-soo, who were the bottom 3 had to write a 400-word apology letter, which will be posted on RM's official Instagram account as a penalty.
540	January 31, 2021 (January 18, 2021)	Uneasy Sisters: My Little Old Brother (쉽지 않은 누나들－미운 우리 형제)	Cha Chung-hwa; Kim Jae-hwa; Shin Dong-mi	Woodpecker Youth Training Center (Gwangjeok-myeon, Yangju, Gyeonggi Province)	Cha's Family (Cha Chang-hwa, Yoo Jae-suk, Ji Suk-jin, Jeon So-min); Kim's Family (Kim Jae-hwa, Haha, Lee Kwang-soo); Shin's Family (Shin Dong-mi, Kim Jong-kook, Song Ji-hyo, Yang Se-chan)		Being the Top 3 with the most money to receive a prize and without having the least money at the end of the race to avoid penalty (Note: An additional penalty slot will be added every time a family uses Dad's Chance.)	Yoo Jae-suk, Lee Kwang-soo and Shin Dong-mi Wins; Yoo Jae-suk, Lee Kwang-soo and Shin Dong-mi each received a strawberry gift set, which Yoo Jae-suk and Lee Kwang-soo gave theirs to Cha Chang-hwa and Kim Jae-hwa. Haha, Ji Suk-jin and Kim Jae-hwa, who were the bottom 3 had to cook meals for themselves after filming as a penalty.
541	February 7, 2021 (January 25, 2021)	2021 New Year Trick Race: Take my Bad Luck (2021 신년 액땜 레이스－내 불운 가져가)	Ahn Eun-jin; Bae Yoon-kyung; Lee Sang-yi	SBS Tanhyeon-dong Production Center (Ilsanseo District, Goyang, Gyeonggi Province)	Need Communication; Yoon-kyung Team (Bae Yoon-kyung, Yoo Jae-suk, Haha, Yang Se-chan); Eun-jin Team (Ahn Eun-jin, Ji Suk-jin, Kim Jong-kook, Song Ji-hyo); Penalty Men Team (Lee Sang-yi, Lee Kwang-soo, Jeon So-min); What About Apples; Penalty Men Team (Lee Sang-yi, Yoo Jae-suk, Lee Kwang-soo, Jeon So-min); Yoon-kyung Team (Bae Yoon-kyung, Haha, Yang Se-chan); Eun-jin Team (Ahn Eun-jin, Ji Suk-jin, Kim Jong-kook, Song Ji-hyo)	Final Mission; Red Team (Yoo Jae-suk^{P}, Lee Kwang-soo^{P}, Jeon So-min^{P}, Ahn Eun-jin^{P}, Lee Sang-yi^{P}); Blue Team (Haha, Ji Suk-jin, Kim Jong-kook, Song Ji-hyo, Yang Se-chan, Bae Yoon-kyung)	Collect as many mission funds to discard penalty tickets so as to reduce the chances of the ticket number getting chosen through lottery to avoid penalty (Note: In the final mission, the penalty men (marked with ^{P}) who are grouped in the losing team will automatically receive penalty.)	Kim Jong-kook, Song Ji-hyo, Jeon So-min and Bae Yoon-kyung Wins; Yang Se-chan was exempted from the penalty through a game of luck. Haha, Ji Suk-jin and Lee Kwang-soo received water cannon penalty alongside penalty men Yoo Jae-suk, Ahn Eun-jin and Lee Sang-yi, who were grouped in the losing team.
542	February 14, 2021 (February 1, 2021)	2021 Running Man Community Games with Penthouse (2021 런닝맨 동네 체전 with 펜트하우스)	Ha Do-kwon; Park Eun-seok; Yoon Jong-hoon	Yongin Dream Park Academy (Giheung District, Yongin, Gyeonggi Province)	Yellow Team (Yoo Jae-suk, Ji Suk-jin, Kim Jong-kook, Yoon Jong-hoon); Blue Team (Haha, Jeon So-min, Ha Do-kwon, Park Eun-seok); Red Team (Lee Kwang-soo, Song Ji-hyo, Yang Se-chan)		Being the Top 3 with the most trophy stamps to receive a prize and without being the bottom place to avoid penalty	Haha, Kim Jong-kook and Song Ji-hyo Wins; Haha, who had the most trophy stamps received a Korean beef set, Kim Jong-kook received a rice cake set and Song Ji-hyo received a Korean pork set. Ji Suk-jin, who had the least trophy stamps, chooses Lee Kwang-soo to receive kite flying penalty together.
543	February 21, 2021 (February 8, 2021)	Running Investment Conference: Masters of Investment (런닝투자대회－투자의 귀재들)	No Guests	YBM Academy (Jeongnam-myeon, Hwaseong, Gyeonggi)	No Teams		Being the Top 2 with the most R money to receive a prize and without being the bottom place to avoid penalty	Yoo Jae-suk and Yang Se-chan Wins; First-placed Yang Se-chan received a 40kg rice bag and second-placed Yoo Jae-suk received a 20kg rice bag. Ji Suk-jin, who had the least R money, had to carry Yoo Jae-suk and Yang Se-chan's rice bags to their van by himself as a penalty. Final Standings: Rank / Player; 1 / Yang Se-chan; 2 / Yoo Jae-suk; 3 / Song Ji-hyo; 4 / Kim Jong-kook; 5 / Jeon So-min; 6 / Haha; 7 / Lee Kwang-soo; 8 / Ji Suk-jin
544 (Note: Ji Suk-jin's birthday special.)	February 28, 2021 (February 8 & 9, 2021)	Running Investment Conference: Masters of Investment (런닝투자대회－투자의 귀재들)	No Guests	YBM Academy (Jeongnam-myeon, Hwaseong, Gyeonggi)	No Teams		Being the Top 2 with the most R money to receive a prize and without being the bottom place to avoid penalty	Yoo Jae-suk and Yang Se-chan Wins; First-placed Yang Se-chan received a 40kg rice bag and second-placed Yoo Jae-suk received a 20kg rice bag. Ji Suk-jin, who had the least R money, had to carry Yoo Jae-suk and Yang Se-chan's rice bags to their van by himself as a penalty. Final Standings: Rank / Player; 1 / Yang Se-chan; 2 / Yoo Jae-suk; 3 / Song Ji-hyo; 4 / Kim Jong-kook; 5 / Jeon So-min; 6 / Haha; 7 / Lee Kwang-soo; 8 / Ji Suk-jin
544	February 28, 2021 (February 8 & 9, 2021)	Suk-jin's Day: See The Gold Now (석진's Day－지금(金) 만나러 갑니다)	No Guests	Salimchae Korean House (Songchon-dong, Paju, Gyeonggi Province)	Mission Team (Yoo Jae-suk, Haha, Song Ji-hyo, Jeon So-min, Yang Se-chan)	Suk-jin Team (Ji Suk-jin, Kim Jong-kook, Lee Kwang-soo)	Being the first member to find the hidden gold and avoid penalty	Suk-jin Team Wins; Ji Suk-jin, Kim Jong-kook and Lee Kwang-soo each received a golden R ring. Haha and Song Ji-hyo were chosen by Ji Suk-jin to record Ji Suk-jin's birthday celebration video after filming as a penalty, which will be posted on RM's official Instagram account and YouTube channel.
545	March 7, 2021 (February 9, 2021)	Room Inside The Village: Find The Gold Now (마을 속 집으로－지금(金) 찾으러 갑니다)	No Guests	Salimchae Korean House (Songchon-dong, Paju, Gyeonggi Province)	Mission Team (Yoo Jae-suk, Haha, Song Ji-hyo, Jeon So-min, Yang Se-chan)	Suk-jin Team (Ji Suk-jin, Kim Jong-kook, Lee Kwang-soo)	Being the first member to find the hidden gold and avoid penalty	Suk-jin Team Wins; Ji Suk-jin, Kim Jong-kook and Lee Kwang-soo each received a golden R ring. Haha and Song Ji-hyo were chosen by Ji Suk-jin to record Ji Suk-jin's birthday celebration video after filming as a penalty, which will be posted on RM's official Instagram account and YouTube channel.
546	March 14, 2021 (February 22, 2021)	Running Dynasty Records: The Appearance of The Evil Spirit (런닝 왕조 실록－악령의 등장)	Jang Dong-yoon; Keum Sae-rok; Kim Dong-jun (ZE:A); Park Sung-hoon	YBM Academy (Jeongnam-myeon, Hwaseong, Gyeonggi)	Human Team (Yoo Jae-suk, Haha, Ji Suk-jin, Kim Jong-kook, Lee Kwang-soo, Song Ji-hyo, Jeon So-min, Yang Se-chan, Kim Dong-jun, Park Sung-hoon)	Evil Spirits (Jang Dong-yoon, Keum Sae-rok)	Human Team's Mission; Identify and apprehend both of the Evil Spirits through 3 rounds of trial and without having the least rice Evil Spirits' Mission; Finish all of the hidden missions without being apprehend by the Human Team	Evil Spirits Wins; Jang Dong-yoon and Keum Sae-rok each received a western fruit and macaron gift set. Lee Kwang-soo, who had the least rice among members in the losing team, received the flogging penalty by Yang Se-chan.
547	March 21, 2021 (February 23, 2021)	Yoo Daesang VS Kim Daesang: The Dignity of Daesang (유대상 VS 김대상－대상의 품격)	No guests	Sea Garden Pension (Naega-myeon, Ganghwa County, Incheon)	Two-Body Hide-and-Seek; Yoo Daesang Team (Yoo Jae-suk, Haha, Lee Kwang-soo); Kim Daesang Team (Kim Jong-kook, Ji Suk-jin, Song Ji-hyo, Jeon So-min, Yang Se-chan); Do As I Say; Yoo Daesang Team (Yoo Jae-suk, Haha, Jeon So-min); Kim Daesang Team (Kim Jong-kook, Ji Suk-jin, Lee Kwang-soo, Song Ji-hyo, Yang Se-chan); The Uncanny Quiz; Yoo Daesang Team (Yoo Jae-suk, Haha, Ji Suk-jin, Lee Kwang-soo, Jeon So-min, Yang Se-chan); Kim Daesang Team (Kim Jong-kook, Song Ji-hyo)		Being the first place with the highest score to receive a prize and without being the bottom two with the lowest score at the end of the race to avoid penalty	Lee Kwang-soo Wins; Lee Kwang-soo received a thumbs up trophy and was exempted from the penalty. Kim Jong-kook and Song Ji-hyo, who were the bottom two, chooses Jeon So-min to pick up 3 "R" flags around the mudflat together as a penalty. Final Standings: Rank / Player / Pts; 1 / Lee Kwang-soo / 28; 2 / Yang Se-chan / 20; 3 / Ji Suk-jin / 17; 4 / Yoo Jae-suk / 15; 4 / Haha / 15; 6 / Jeon So-min / 4; 7 / Kim Jong-kook / 3; 7 / Song Ji-hyo / 3
548	March 28, 2021 (March 1, 2021)	Catch The Star of FA: Stars' Contract War (FA의 별을 잡아라－별들의 계약전쟁)	Jessi; Wooyoung (2PM)	TBC	Artists (Yoo Jae-suk, Kim Jong-kook, Song Ji-hyo, Yang Se-chan, Jessi, Wooyoung); CEO-turned-Artist (Ji Suk-jin)	CEOs (Haha, Lee Kwang-soo, Jeon So-min)	Artists' Mission; Being the Top 4 with the most funds to receive a prize and without being the bottom 3 with the least funds to avoid penalty CEOs' Mission; Being the Top 2 with the most funds to receive a prize and without being the bottom with the least funds to avoid penalty	Yoo Jae-suk, Kim Jong-kook, Lee Kwang-soo, Song Ji-hyo, Jeon So-min and Yang Se-chan Wins; Yoo Jae-suk, Kim Jong-kook, Lee Kwang-soo, Song Ji-hyo, Jeon So-min and Yang Se-chan each received a Jeju hallabong gift set. Ji Suk-jin, Jessi and Wooyoung, who were the bottom 3 artists each received a penalty of signing 100 autographs alongside Haha, who was the loser among other CEOs.
549	April 4, 2021 (March 22, 2021)	Being an Idol Project: Brave Idol's Day (아이들 되기 Project－용감한 아이들의 하루)	Eunji; Minyoung; Yujeong; Yuna (Brave Girls)	SBS Open Hall (Deungchon-dong, Gangseo-gu, Seoul)	Turtle Team (Yujeong, Yoo Jae-suk, Lee Kwang-soo, Song Ji-hyo); Main Vocal Team (Minyoung, Haha, Kim Jong-kook, Jeon So-min); Big Eyes Short Hair Team (Eunji, Yuna, Ji Suk-jin, Yang Se-chan)		Being the Top 3 with the most trophy medals to receive a prize and without being the bottom 3 with the least trophy medals to avoid penalty	Minyoung, Yujeong and Yuna Wins; Minyoung, Yujeong and Yuna each received an idol fatigue-eliminating gift set. Yoo Jae-suk, who had the same number of trophy medals as Haha and Kim Jong-kook, was exempted from the penalty through a game of rock paper scissors. Haha, Kim Jong-kook and Lee Kwang-soo received the shredded paper, water and ink water shower penalty respectively.
550	April 11, 2021 (March 15, 2021)	10 Minutes VS 1 Hour: Sweet Savage's Off Work Road (10분 VS 1시간－달콤살벌한 퇴근길)	Choa; Jo Se-ho	Dosan Park (Sinsa-dong, Gangnam, Seoul)	Gangnam Team (Yoo Jae-suk, Ji Suk-jin, Kim Jong-kook, Lee Kwang-soo, Choa)	Mapo Team (Haha, Song Ji-hyo, Jeon So-min, Yang Se-chan, Jo Se-ho)	Win as many missions to increase the chance of winning on the final roulette	Gangnam Team Wins; Gangnam Team received rice cake sets. Mapo Team suffered the evening rush hour.
551	April 18, 2021 (March 29, 2021)	I Also Want to Find an Entertainment Partner (나도 예능 짝을 찾고 싶다)	Jung Hye-in; Lee Cho-hee; Seol In-ah	Adela Korean House (Gaegun-myeon, Yangpyeong County, Gyeonggi Province)	Crazy Speed Quiz; Seol In-ah Team (Seol In-ah, Yoo Jae-suk, Kim Jong-kook, Jeon So-min); Lee Cho-hee Team (Lee Cho-hee, Haha, Song Ji-hyo, Yang Se-chan); Jung Hye-in Team (Jung Hye-in, Ji Suk-jin, Lee Kwang-soo)	Roll Around in Rhythm; No Teams	Match with the opposite gender to avoid penalty Additional mission: Have the highest number of votes to receive a gold bar	Haha, Kim Jong-kook, Song Ji-hyo, Yang Se-chan, Lee Cho-hee and Seol In-ah Wins; Song Ji-hyo, Yang Se-chan and Seol In-ah, each of whom obtained two votes, received a gold bar respectively. Yoo Jae-suk was exempted from the penalty having obtained a voting abstention right. Ji Suk-jin, Lee Kwang-soo, Jeon So-min and Jung Hye-in, all of whom failed to find a match, each received a water slap and a face rub with black ink on their faces as a penalty.
552	April 25, 2021 (March 29, 2021)	I Also Want to Find an Entertainment Partner (나도 예능 짝을 찾고 싶다)	Jung Hye-in; Lee Cho-hee; Seol In-ah	Adela Korean House (Gaegun-myeon, Yangpyeong County, Gyeonggi Province)	Crazy Speed Quiz; Seol In-ah Team (Seol In-ah, Yoo Jae-suk, Kim Jong-kook, Jeon So-min); Lee Cho-hee Team (Lee Cho-hee, Haha, Song Ji-hyo, Yang Se-chan); Jung Hye-in Team (Jung Hye-in, Ji Suk-jin, Lee Kwang-soo)	Roll Around in Rhythm; No Teams	Match with the opposite gender to avoid penalty Additional mission: Have the highest number of votes to receive a gold bar	Haha, Kim Jong-kook, Song Ji-hyo, Yang Se-chan, Lee Cho-hee and Seol In-ah Wins; Song Ji-hyo, Yang Se-chan and Seol In-ah, each of whom obtained two votes, received a gold bar respectively. Yoo Jae-suk was exempted from the penalty having obtained a voting abstention right. Ji Suk-jin, Lee Kwang-soo, Jeon So-min and Jung Hye-in, all of whom failed to find a match, each received a water slap and a face rub with black ink on their faces as a penalty.
552	April 25, 2021 (March 29, 2021)	Time Machine Race: Semester '91 Is BACK! (타임머신 레이스－91학번 Is BACK!)	No guests	Old and Sides LP Bar (Sajik-dong, Jongno District, Seoul)	No Teams		Win as many presents to receive a prize and without being the bottom 2 to avoid penalty	Yoo Jae-suk, Haha, Ji Suk-jin, Kim Jong-kook, Lee Kwang-soo and Jeon So-min Wins; Yoo Jae-suk, Haha, Ji Suk-jin, Kim Jong-kook, Lee Kwang-soo and Jeon So-min each received a vintage item. Song Ji-hyo and Yang Se-chan, who were the bottom 2 with the least presents, had to record an 1-minute Running Man advertisement after filming as a penalty, which will be posted on RM's official Instagram account and YouTube channel.
553	May 2, 2021 (April 19, 2021)	Time Machine Race: Semester '91 Is BACK! (타임머신 레이스－91학번 Is BACK!)	No guests	Old and Sides LP Bar (Sajik-dong, Jongno District, Seoul)	No Teams		Win as many presents to receive a prize and without being the bottom 2 to avoid penalty	Yoo Jae-suk, Haha, Ji Suk-jin, Kim Jong-kook, Lee Kwang-soo and Jeon So-min Wins; Yoo Jae-suk, Haha, Ji Suk-jin, Kim Jong-kook, Lee Kwang-soo and Jeon So-min each received a vintage item. Song Ji-hyo and Yang Se-chan, who were the bottom 2 with the least presents, had to record an 1-minute Running Man advertisement after filming as a penalty, which will be posted on RM's official Instagram account and YouTube channel.
554	May 9, 2021 (April 5, 2021)	Card Payment Race: If You Go to The Radio Station (카드 결제 레이스－방송국에 가면)	No guests	SBS Broadcasting Center (Mok-dong, Yangcheon District, Seoul)	No Teams		Win as many missions to reduce the number of marbles on hand and without being the ones owning the final 5 marbles to finish during the marble race to avoid penalty	Yoo Jae-suk, Kim Jong-kook, Song Ji-hyo and Yang Se-chan Wins; Yang Se-chan had 0 marbles, hence was automatically exempt. Jeon So-min was exempted from the penalty for winning the consolation race. Haha, Ji Suk-jin and Lee Kwang-soo each had to wear a criminal wig and cangue while staying in the building concourse for 5 minutes during off-hours as a penalty.
555	May 16, 2021 (April 12, 2021)	The Clever Escape Race: Empty Head Land (똑똑한 탈출 레이스－깡깡랜드)	No guests	SBS Prism Tower (Sangam-dong, Mapo District, Seoul)	Genius Team (Yoo Jae-suk, Kim Jong-kook, Lee Kwang-soo, Song Ji-hyo, Jeon So-min, Yang Se-chan)	Dunce Team (Haha, Ji Suk-jin)	Escape from the room within 6 hours	Genius Team Wins; Genius Team received all the prize ₩ 3,000,000 and the medal. Dunce Team had to record Yang Se-chan's Empty Head Video after filming as a penalty.
556	May 23, 2021 (April 26, 2021)	We Will Find Spring (봄을 찾아드립니다)	Lee Yong-jin; Sung Si-kyung	Luka 511 (Cheongdam-dong, Gangnam, Seoul)	Married Corporation (Lee Yong-jin, Yoo Jae-suk, Haha, Ji Suk-jin); Single.com Corporation (Sung Si-kyung, Kim Jong-kook, Lee Kwang-soo, Yang Se-chan); Clients (Song Ji-hyo, Jeon So-min)		Being in the Top 3 position in the winning company at the end of the race to receive 3 gold bars	Married Corporation Wins; Yoo Jae-suk, Ji Suk-jin and Lee Yong-jin, who were the Top 3 position in the company, each received a gold bar.
557 (Note: Children's Day special.) (Note: Special appearance by Haha's oldest son, Ha Dream.)	May 30, 2021 (May 3, 2021)	Off-hour Race: THE Pay Attention (퇴근 레이스－THE 눈치 챙겨)	No guests	Nodeulseom (Ichon-dong, Yongsan District, Seoul)	Running Man Team (Yoo Jae-suk, Haha, Ji Suk-jin, Kim Jong-kook, Lee Kwang-soo, Song Ji-hyo, Jeon So-min, Yang Se-chan); Architect (Ha Dream)		Fake mission: Collect 'R' coins as fast as possible to leave the filming early	No Winners; Ha Dream received Nintendo Switch physical games as a present.
558	June 6, 2021 (May 10, 2021)	Prepare Three Meals: Three Meals Jae-suk (세 끼를 차려라－재석 세 끼)	No guests	Korea House (Pil-dong, Jung District, Seoul)	No Teams		Without being the three who were drawn with the punishment stick	Yoo Jae-suk, Haha, Song Ji-hyo, Jeon So-min and Yang Se-chan Wins; Kim Jong-kook, who was a supervisor at the end of the race, chooses Lee Kwang-soo to receive a 1++ Korean Beef set together, but both of them were also drawn with the punishment stick, so they received the washing three meals dishes penalty after the filming along with Ji Suk-jin, who was also drawn with the punishment stick.
559 (Note: Lee Kwang-soo's last episode as a member.)	June 13, 2021 (May 24, 2021)	Goodbye Our Inseparable Bro (굿바이 우리의 특별한 형제)	No guests	Old and Sides LP Bar (Sajik-dong, Jongno District, Seoul)	No Teams		Member's Mission: Help Lee Kwang-soo to reduce his 1,050 year-prison sentence while acquiring the most photos with him to receive prizes and avoid penalty. Kwang-soo's Mission: Help all the members to acquire the same amount of photos in order for them to receive gifts from him.	Everyone Wins; Yoo Jae-suk, Haha, Ji Suk-jin, Kim Jong-kook, Song Ji-hyo, Jeon So-min and Yang Se-chan each received a hoodie, a designer's clutch bag, a set of branded clothes, a soundbar, a bedding set, a bottle of sweet champagne and a picture frame, respectively. The production team gave a commemorative golden plaque to Lee Kwang-soo as a farewell present.
560	June 20, 2021 (May 31, 2021)	County Blood Day: The First Entertainment Enthusiast Jungmo (현피Day－제1회 오락 마니아 정모)	No guests	SBS Prism Tower (Sangam-dong, Mapo District, Seoul)	No Teams		Being the Top 2 with the most integral to receive a prize and without being the bottom 2 with the least integral to avoid penalty	Haha and Yang Se-chan Wins; They received a tomahawk steak and melon gift set respectively. Song Ji-hyo was chosen through a game of luck to receive ink water gun shooting penalty by Ji Suk-jin. Final Standings: Rank / Player; 1 / Haha; 2 / Yang Se-chan; 3 / Yoo Jae-suk; 4 / Kim Jong-kook; 5 / Jeon So-min; 6 / Song Ji-hyo; 7 / Ji Suk-jin
561	June 27, 2021 (June 7, 2021)	Pleasant & Unpleasant: Bliss Men and Women Vacance (유쾌 & 불쾌－쾌걸남녀 바캉스)	Han Chae-young; Heo Young-ji	Cafe SAN (Namhansanseong-myeon, Gwangju, Gyeonggi-do)	No Teams		Get chosen by the roulette wheel to receive a prize but without being the Top 2 with the most votes and become two unpleasant men after the final voting to avoid penalty.	Heo Young-ji Wins; Heo Young-ji receives a ₩ 150,000 Vacation fee. Ji Suk-jin and Jeon So-min, who became the Unpleasant men after the voting went inside the natural valley and received the stream water penalty.
562	July 4, 2021 (June 21, 2021)	Talk Hell: The Day of Slaughter (토크지옥－노가리 까는 날)	No guests	Martian Dream Park Ballpark (Ujeong-eup, Hwaseong, Gyeonggi)	Upper Rank (Yoo Jae-suk, Haha, Ji Suk-jin, Kim Jong-kook); Lower Rank (Song Ji-hyo, Jeon So-min, Yang Se-chan)		Offset all 100 mintay fish by KST 3:00PM, otherwise one penalty man will be added every hour (base on 2 penalty men).	Yoo Jae-suk, Ji Suk-jin, Kim Jong-kook, Song Ji-hyo and Jeon So-min Wins; Haha and Yang Se-chan was chosen through a game of luck to hit and pick up 10 baseballs after the filming as a penalty.
563 (Note: 11th Anniversary Special.)	July 11, 2021 (June 22, 2021)	Role Shooter Race: A Little Weird Family Photo (역할 사수 레이스－조금 기묘한 가족사진)	No guests	Around Studio (Nonhyeon-dong, Gangnam District, Seoul)	Jae-suk Team (Yoo Jae-suk, Jeon So-min); Haha Team (Haha, Song Ji-hyo, Yang Se-chan); Suk-jin Team (Ji Suk-jin, Kim Jong-kook)		Use the cost raised by the team to auction the role	No Winners The Casting Results: Player / Cast; Yoo Jae-suk / Middle School Female Student; Haha / Grandmother; Ji Suk-jin / Father; Kim Jong-kook / Mother; Song Ji-hyo / Dalmatian; Jeon So-min / Newborn Baby; Yang Se-chan / Green Onion
564	July 18, 2021 (July 5, 2021)	But The Price Is Postpaid: Get One's Wish (단, 대가는 후불－소원을 이뤄드립니다)	Chae Jong-hyeop; Ha Do-kwon; Nam Ji-hyun	SBS Tanhyeon-dong Production Center (Ilsanseo District, Goyang, Gyeonggi Province)	Song Ji-hyo Team (Song Ji-hyo, Haha, Jeon So-min, Yang Se-chan, Ha Do-kwon); Nam Ji-hyun Team (Nam Ji-hyun, Yoo Jae-suk, Ji Suk-jin, Kim Jong-kook, Chae Jong-hyeop)		The two who were drawn by the wish box to make their wishes but without were drawn by the price box to avoid penalty	Jeon So-min and Chae Jong-hyeop Wins; They made their wishes of the production team will tell herself the answers to the English and Chinese questions and Haha will help him purchase high-quality speaker respectively. Kim Jong-kook and Song Ji-hyo, who were drawn by the price box received the shredded paper and ink water shower penalty respectively.
565	August 8, 2021 (July 6, 2021)	Theft of Comedians Guild Fees (희극인 협회비 도난 사건)	Lee Yong-jin	SBS Open Hall (Deungchon-dong, Gangseo-gu, Seoul)	Senior Team (Yoo Jae-suk, Ji Suk-jin, Yang Se-chan, Lee Yong-jin); Junior Team (Haha, Kim Jong-kook, Song Ji-hyo, Jeon So-min)		Both teams must pay ₩ 2,000,000 association fees before KST 4:00PM to avoid penalty	Both Teams Win
566	August 15, 2021 (July 19, 2021)	Choose The Fate From Your Own Hands: The First Filial Piety Shooting Operation (내 손으로 운명 선택－제1회 효도비 사수 작전)	No Guests	Bank Tree Pension (Sudong-myeon, Namyangju, Gyeonggi Province)	No Team		Choose the final choice after the mission is finished to get the filial piety	Yoo Jae-suk, Ji Suk-jin, Kim Jong-kook and Song Ji-hyo Wins; They received ₩ 911.5 thousand, 95 thousand, 1.02 million and 780 thousand filial piety respectively. Jeon So-min, who was the bottom in filial piety chose Haha and Yang Se-chan and fell to the abyss of ₩ 0 filial piety together after she failed her challenge.
567	August 22, 2021 (August 9, 2021)	Team Choosing Race: Young-ji VS Young-ji (팀 선택 레이스－영지 VS 영지)	Heo Young-ji; Lee Young-ji	TBC	Heo Young-ji Team (Heo Young-ji, Yoo Jae-suk, Kim Jong-kook, Jeon So-min, Yang Se-chan); Lee Young-ji Team (Lee Young-ji, Haha, Ji Suk-jin, Song Ji-hyo)		Being the Top 3 with the highest marks to receive a prize and without being the bottom 2 with the lowest marks to avoid penalty	Kim Jong-kook, Heo Young-ji and Lee Young-ji Wins; They each received korean beef and ganoderma lucidum sets. Song Ji-hyo and Jeon So-min were chosen to wear down jackets to receive hot foot bath penalty.
568	August 29, 2021 (August 16, 2021)	Find The Best Price Doll: Strict Doll Appraiser (최고가 인형을 찾아라－매서운 인형 감별사)	No Guests	Hongwon Training Institute (Jori-eup, Paju, Gyeonggi Province)	Human Team (Yoo Jae-suk, Haha, Ji Suk-jin, Kim Jong-kook, Jeon So-min, Yang Se-chan)	Ghost (Song Ji-hyo)	Ghost's Mission; Let Human Team cannot find the Ghost's cursed doll Human Team's Mission; Identify, find and destroy the Ghost's cursed doll	Human Team Wins; Song Ji-hyo had to make handmade dolls after the filming as a penalty.
569	September 5, 2021 (August 23, 2021)	Couple Race: Yoo Raise Man Up! (커플 레이스－유 레이즈 맨 업!)	Hani (EXID); Park Ki-woong; Yoon Shi-yoon	Villa De GD Suseo (Segok-dong, Gangnam, Seoul)	First Mission; Doctor Yoo Team (Yoo Jae-suk, Haha, Ji Suk-jin, Yang Se-chan); Song Ji-hyo Team (Song Ji-hyo, Kim Jong-kook); Jeon So-min Team (Jeon So-min, Park Ki-woong); Ahn Hee-yeon Team (Hani, Yoon Shi-yoon); Second Mission; Doctor Yoo Team (Yoo Jae-suk, Haha, Yong Shi-yoon, Yang Se-chan); Song Ji-hyo Team (Song Ji-hyo, Kim Jong-kook); Jeon So-min Team (Jeon So-min, Ji Suk-jin); Ahn Hee-yeon Team (Hani, Park Ki-woong)	Third Mission; Doctor Yoo Team (Yoo Jae-suk, Haha, Kim Jong-kook, Park Ki-woong); Song Ji-hyo Team (Song Ji-hyo, Yoon Shi-yoon); Jeon So-min Team (Jeon So-min, Yang Se-chan); Ahn Hee-yeon Team (Hani, Ji Suk-jin); Final Mission; Doctor Yoo Team (Yoo Jae-suk, Haha, Ji Suk-jin, Park Ki-woong); Song Ji-hyo Team (Song Ji-hyo, Yang Se-chan); Jeon So-min Team (Jeon So-min, Yoon Shi-yoon); Ahn Hee-yeon Team (Hani, Kim Jong-kook)	Being the Top 2 highest score to avoid being picked by the Bottom 2 lowest score for join a penalty with them	Yoo Jae-suk and Song Ji-hyo Wins; Yang Se-chan and Yoon Shi-yoon chose Kim Jong-kook to receive squat 100 times penalty together after the filming.
570	September 12, 2021 (August 30, 2021)	Catch The Mafia: The Messy Running Man (마피아를 잡아라－혼돈의 런닝맨)	No Guests	Grand InterContinental Seoul Parnas Hotel (Samseong-dong, Gangnam, Seoul)	Catch the Mafia 1 & 2 Civilian Team (Haha, Ji Suk-jin, Kim Jong-kook, Song Ji-hyo, Yang Se-chan); Mafia Team (Yoo Jae-suk, Jeon So-min); Catch the Mafia 3 Civilian Team (Yoo Jae-suk, Kim Jong-kook, Song Ji-hyo, Jeon So-min, Yang Se-chan); Mafia Team (Haha, Ji Suk-jin)	Catch the Mafia 4 Civilian Team (Yoo Jae-suk, Haha, Ji Suk-jin, Song Ji-hyo, Yang Se-chan); Mafia Team (Kim Jong-kook, Jeon So-min)	Being the Top 2 with the most money to receive a prize and avoid being the Bottom 2 at the end of the race for a penalty	Kim Jong-kook and Yang Se-chan Wins; Kim Jong-kook and Yang Se-chan each received the highest grade chocolate gift set. Haha and Ji Suk-jin, who were the Bottom 2 had to buy the highest-grade chocolate gifts for Kim Jong-kook and Yang Se-chan as a penalty.
571	September 19, 2021 (September 6, 2021)	Coliseum Revival Project: Curator Kook and Country Representative (체육관 부흥 프로젝트－꾹관장과 국가대표)	Lee Mi-joo (Lovelyz); Lee Sang-joon; Lee Young-ji	TBC	Guess the Rank; Glasses Team (Yoo Jae-suk, Haha, Ji Suk-jin, Lee Mi-joo, Lee Sang-joon); No Glasees Team (Kim Jong-kook, Song Ji-hyo, Jeon So-min, Yang Se-chan, Lee Young-ji); Trainer (Kim Jong-kook); Captain (Yang Se-chan); T.S.S Championship; Mi-joo Team (Lee Mi-joo, Yoo Jae-suk, Haha, Song Ji-hyo, Yang Se-chan); Young-ji Team (Lee Young-ji, Ji Suk-jin, Kim Jong-kook, Jeon So-min, Lee Sang-joon); Trainer (Kim Jong-kook); Captain (Yoo Jae-suk)	Badminton Pool; Young-ji Team (Lee Young-ji, Yoo Jae-suk, Haha, Ji Suk-jin, Song Ji-hyo); Mi-joo Team (Lee Mi-joo, Kim Jong-kook, Jeon So-min, Yang Se-chan, Lee Sang-joon); Trainer (Kim Jong-kook); Captain (Yoo Jae-suk)	Being the first place with the most money at the end of the race to be a second new trainer on the next episode.	Yoo Jae-suk Wins; Yoo Jae-suk will be a second trainer on the next episode.
572 (Note: Volleyball Special.)	September 26, 2021 (September 13, 2021)	Women's Volleyball Team: Sparkling Transfer Contract (여자 배구 선수팀－불꽃 튀는 환승 계약)	Ahn Hye-jin; Kim Hee-jin; Kim Yeon-koung; Lee So-young; Oh Ji-young; Park Eun-jin; Yeum Hye-seon (South Korea women's national volleyball team)	SBS Tanhyeon-dong Production Center (Ilsanseo District, Goyang, Gyeonggi Province)	Grasshopper Gym; Trainer (Yoo Jae-suk); Athletes (Jeon So-min, Yang Se-chan, Ahn Hye-jin, Kim Yeon-koung, Park Eun-jin, Yeum Hye-seon)	Tiger Gym; Trainer (Kim Jong-kook); Athletes (Haha, Ji Suk-jin, Song Ji-hyo, Kim Hee-jin, Lee So-young, Oh Ji-young)	Trainer's Mission; Being the most money at the end of the race to receive prizes and avoid penalty Athletes' Mission; Being the Top 3 with the most money to receive prizes and avoid being a candidate for penalty with the Bottom 2 which can choosing 2 more people	Yoo Jae-suk, Kim Hee-jin, Lee So-young and Yeum Hye-seon Wins; Yoo Jae-suk, Kim Hee-jin, Lee So-young and Yeum Hye-seon received the highest grade korean beef set. Haha and Yang Se-chan, who were the Bottom 2 chooses Kim Yeon-koung and Oh Ji-young to play a game of luck with Kim Jong-kook, who was the loser trainer. Through a game of luck, Kim Jong-kook, Kim Yeon-koung and Oh Ji-young received the different color whipped cream penalty.
573	October 3, 2021 (September 13, 2021)	Sparkling Transfer Contract II: Negotiations of The Big Guys (불꽃 튀는 환승 계약II：꺽다리들의 협상)	Ahn Hye-jin; Kim Hee-jin; Kim Yeon-koung; Lee So-young; Oh Ji-young; Park Eun-jin; Yeum Hye-seon (South Korea women's national volleyball team)	SBS Tanhyeon-dong Production Center (Ilsanseo District, Goyang, Gyeonggi Province)	Grasshopper Gym; Trainer (Yoo Jae-suk); Athletes (Jeon So-min, Yang Se-chan, Ahn Hye-jin, Kim Yeon-koung, Park Eun-jin, Yeum Hye-seon)	Tiger Gym; Trainer (Kim Jong-kook); Athletes (Haha, Ji Suk-jin, Song Ji-hyo, Kim Hee-jin, Lee So-young, Oh Ji-young)	Trainer's Mission; Being the most money at the end of the race to receive prizes and avoid penalty Athletes' Mission; Being the Top 3 with the most money to receive prizes and avoid being a candidate for penalty with the Bottom 2 which can choosing 2 more people	Yoo Jae-suk, Kim Hee-jin, Lee So-young and Yeum Hye-seon Wins; Yoo Jae-suk, Kim Hee-jin, Lee So-young and Yeum Hye-seon received the highest grade korean beef set. Haha and Yang Se-chan, who were the Bottom 2 chooses Kim Yeon-koung and Oh Ji-young to play a game of luck with Kim Jong-kook, who was the loser trainer. Through a game of luck, Kim Jong-kook, Kim Yeon-koung and Oh Ji-young received the different color whipped cream penalty.
574 (Note: Italy Special.) (Note: Jeon So-min did not participate in this episode.)	October 10, 2021 (September 13 & 28, 2021)	The Hard Way for Italian Gentlemen and Ladies: Characteristic Western Food Road (힘겨운 이태리 신사숙녀의 길－품격있는 양식로드)	Ahn Hye-jin; Kim Hee-jin; Kim Yeon-koung; Lee So-young; Oh Ji-young; Park Eun-jin; Yeum Hye-seon (South Korea women's national volleyball team)	SBS Tanhyeon-dong Production Center (Ilsanseo District, Goyang, Gyeonggi Province)	Grasshopper Gym; Trainer (Yoo Jae-suk); Athletes (Jeon So-min, Yang Se-chan, Ahn Hye-jin, Kim Yeon-koung, Park Eun-jin, Yeum Hye-seon)	Tiger Gym; Trainer (Kim Jong-kook); Athletes (Haha, Ji Suk-jin, Song Ji-hyo, Kim Hee-jin, Lee So-young, Oh Ji-young)	Trainer's Mission; Being the most money at the end of the race to receive prizes and avoid penalty Athletes' Mission; Being the Top 3 with the most money to receive prizes and avoid being a candidate for penalty with the Bottom 2 which can choosing 2 more people	Yoo Jae-suk, Kim Hee-jin, Lee So-young and Yeum Hye-seon Wins; Yoo Jae-suk, Kim Hee-jin, Lee So-young and Yeum Hye-seon received the highest grade korean beef set. Haha and Yang Se-chan, who were the Bottom 2 chooses Kim Yeon-koung and Oh Ji-young to play a game of luck with Kim Jong-kook, who was the loser trainer. Through a game of luck, Kim Jong-kook, Kim Yeon-koung and Oh Ji-young received the different color whipped cream penalty.
574	October 10, 2021 (September 13 & 28, 2021)	The Hard Way for Italian Gentlemen and Ladies: Characteristic Western Food Road (힘겨운 이태리 신사숙녀의 길－품격있는 양식로드)	No Guests	CONVERTOR (Sinsa-dong, Gangnam, Seoul)	No Teams		Being the Top 2 with the most prize badge to receive a prize or avoid getting penalty ball draws by Production Team for a penalty	Yoo Jae-suk and Song Ji-hyo Wins; Yoo Jae-suk and Song Ji-hyo each received Italian ingredients gift set. Haha, whose penalty ball was drawn by Production Team received the water slap penalty by Ji Suk-jin and Yang Se-chan whose penalty ball also was drawn by Production Team.
575 (Note: Jeon So-min returns in this episode.) (Note: Squid Game special theme.)	October 17, 2021 (October 4, 2021)	Webfoot Octopus Game (주꾸미 게임)	No Guests	SBS Prism Tower (Sangam-dong, Mapo District, Seoul)	No Teams		Survive to the end of the race	Yoo Jae-suk Wins; He received the prize ₩ 3,000,000.
576	October 24, 2021 (October 11, 2021)	Choice of Destiny: Golden Ratio Race (운명의 선택－황금비율 레이스)	Bibi; Jeong Jun-ha; Luda (WJSN); Yeji (Itzy)	SBS Prism Tower (Sangam-dong, Mapo District, Seoul)	Quiz Game; Majority Team (Yoo Jae-suk, Ji Suk-jin, Kim Jong-kook, Song Ji-hyo, Jeon So-min, Luda, Yeji); Minority Team (Haha, Yang Se-chan, Bibi, Jeong Jun-ha); Rapid Response Game; Majority Team (Yoo Jae-suk, Haha, Song Ji-hyo, Jeon So-min, Yang Se-chan, Bibi, Jeong Jun-ha, Luda, Yeji); Minority Team (Ji Suk-jin, Kim Jong-kook)	Intuition Game; Minority Team (Yoo Jae-suk, Kim Jong-kook, Song Ji-hyo, Yang Se-chan, Bibi); Majority Team (Haha, Ji Suk-jin, Jeon So-min, Jeong Jun-ha, Luda, Yeji)	Get the higher rank by collecting a point to receive prizes and avoid penalty which selected by the penalty ball that was drawn by Production Team	Yoo Jae-suk, Haha, Ji Suk-jin, Kim Jong-kook, Song Ji-hyo, Yang Se-chan, Bibi and Jeong Jun-ha Wins; Yoo Jae-suk, Haha, Ji Suk-jin, Kim Jong-kook, Song Ji-hyo, Yang Se-chan, Bibi and Jeong Jun-ha each received a fruit set. Jeon So-min, Luda and Yeji, who had a lower rank than 8 received penalty to do an instant choreography by today's guest's song for 1 minute after the filming, which will be posted on RM's official Instagram account. Final Standings: Rank / Player; 1 / Kim Jong-kook; 2 / Song Ji-hyo; 3 / Jeong Jun-ha; 4 / Ji Suk-jin; 5 / Haha; 6 / Yang Se-chan; 7 / Yoo Jae-suk; 7 / Bibi; 9 / Yeji; 10 / Jeon So Min; 11 / Luda
577	October 31, 2021 (October 18, 2021)	The Rehabilitation Project: Icon of Bad Luck (갱생 프로젝트－불운의 아이콘)	Kim Jun-ho	La Vie Douce (Pil-dong, Jung District, Seoul)	No Teams		Being the Top 4 with the most chocolate to receive prizes or avoid having the lesser amount of chocolate than Kim Jun-ho's for a penalty	Haha, Kim Jong-kook, Song Ji-hyo and Jeon So-min Wins; Haha, Kim Jong-kook, Song Ji-hyo and Jeon So-min each received a Korean pork set. Kim Jun-ho, who was the sixth at the end of the race, had to read a fairy tale and write a book report with Yoo Jae-suk and Yang Se-chan who were at the bottom together as a penalty after the filming, which will be posted on RM's official Instagram account. Final Standings: Rank / Player; 1 / Jeon So-min; 2 / Song Ji-hyo; 3 / Kim Jong-kook; 3 / Haha; 5 / Ji Suk-jin; 6 / Kim Jun-ho; 7 / Yoo Jae-suk; 7 / Yang Se-chan
578	November 7, 2021 (October 25, 2021)	Get to Know Each Other Race: The Mountaineering Club I Paid For (서로 알아가는 레이스－내돈 내산 산악회)	Jang Hyuk	Semiwon (Yangseo-myeon, Yangpyeong County, Gyeonggi Province)	No Teams		Being the Top 2 with the least expenditure to receive prizes and without two different name's penalty balls draw by Production Team to avoid penalty	Haha and Jeon So-min Wins; Haha and Jeon So-min each received Gangneung Specialties gift set. Ji Suk-jin and Yang Se-chan, whose penalty ball was drawn by Production Team, went to find the Gangneung signage and took a photo as a penalty after the filming, finally they went to Yangpyeong Station finished the penalty. Final Standings: Rank / Player; 1 / Jeon So-min; 2 / Haha; 3 / Kim Jong-kook; 4 / Yang Se-chan; 5 / Song Ji-hyo; 6 / Yoo Jae-suk; 7 / Ji Suk-jin; 8 / Jang Hyuk
579 (Note: Street Woman Fighter Special.) (Note: Honey J only participated in the opening and left early due to a health issue.)	November 14, 2021 (November 1, 2021)	Street Human Fighter (스트릿 휴먼 파이터)	Aiki; Honey J LEEJUNG; MONIKA (Street Woman Fighter)	SBS Prism Tower (Sangam-dong, Mapo District, Seoul)	MONIKA Crew (MONIKA, Yoo Jae-suk, Ji Suk-jin, Yang Se-chan); LEEJUNG Crew (LEEJUNG, Haha, Kim Jong-kook); Aiki Crew (Aiki, Song Ji-hyo, Jeon So-min)		Being the least penalty badges at the end of the race to receive prizes and without being the most penalty badges to avoid penalty	MONIKA Crew Wins; MONIKA receives the trophy and the new sports camera. Aiki Crew, who had the most penalty badges, will receive the penalty. Through a game of luck, Song Ji-hyo and Aiki received the whipped cream penalty.
580	November 21, 2021 (November 8, 2021)	Running Man VS Production Team: 2021 Running Man Penalty Negotiation (런닝맨 VS 제작진－2021 런닝맨 벌칙협상)	No Guest	SBS Broadcasting Center (Mok-dong, Yangcheon District, Seoul)	Running Man	Production Team	Without team penalty ball draws by announcer to avoid penalty	Running Man Wins; Production Team received the 500kg water cannon penalty.
581	November 28, 2021 (November 15, 2021)	Welcome The New Millennium: At The End of The Century (새천년을 맞이하라－세기말 예언자들)	Arin (Oh My Girl); Jin Ji-hee; San (Ateez)	SBS Open Hall (Deungchon-dong, Gangseo-gu, Seoul)	Civilian Team (Yoo Jae-suk, Ji Suk-jin, Kim Jong-kook, Song Ji-hyo, Jeon So-min, Arin, Jin Ji-hee, San)	Nostra (Haha); Damus (Yang Se-chan)	Nostra and Damus's Mission; Without being apprehend by the Civilian Team or being the Top 2 with the Highest votes on the final voting to avoid penalty Civilian Team's Mission; Identify and apprehend one or both Nostra and Damus to receive prizes and without being the Top 2 with the Highest votes on the final voting to avoid penalty	Civilian Team Wins; Yoo Jae-suk receives ₩ 150,000, Kim Jong-kook and Song Ji-hyo each receive ₩ 50,000, Jeon So-min receives ₩ 100,000, Jin Ji-hee receives ₩ 95,000 and San receives ₩ 175,000 Cash prizes. Haha and Ji Suk-jin, who were the Top 2 with the Highest votes on the final voting received the soapy water slide penalty.
582 (Note: Yang Se-chan's birthday special.)	December 5, 2021 (November 22, 2021)	We Are The Entertainment Family: Hyoja-dong Yang Se-chan (우리는 예능가족－효자동 양세찬)	No Guest	Loiter - Coffee Shelter (Pil-dong, Jung District, Seoul)	Parents Team 1 (Yoo Jae-suk, Jeon So-min); Parents Team 2 (Ji Suk-jin, Song Ji-hyo); Parents Team 3 (Kim Jong-kook, Haha)	Birthday Boy (Yang Se-Chan)	Being the Top 2 with the highest amount of money collected through scratch cards to receive prizes but without being the Bottom 2 with the lowest amount of money to avoid penalty	Yoo Jae-suk and Kim Jong-kook Wins; Yoo Jae-Suk received a korean pork set, Kim Jong-kook received a chicken set and Yang Se-chan, who was the Birthday boy, received a korean beef set. Song Ji-hyo and Jeon So-min, who were the Bottom 2, had to sing a birthday song to Yang Se-chan with massage vibrator on them as a penalty.
583 (Note: Yumi's Cells Special Theme.)	December 12, 2021 (November 29, 2021)	Sukjin's Cells (석진이의 세포들)	No Guest	Beaker (Apgujeong-dong, Gangnam District, Seoul)	No Teams		Being the Top 2 with the prizes ball was drawn the fastest by the Production Team to receive prizes and avoid penalty	Yoo Jae-suk and Haha Wins; Yoo Jae-suk and Haha each received a champagne present. Ji Suk-jin, whose prizes ball was not drawn by the production team, had to wear the clothes which were worn by himself during the next episode opening as a penalty.
584 (Note: Year-End Party special.)	December 19, 2021 (December 7, 2021)	2021 Witty Year-End Party (2021 슬기로운 연말 파티)	Cha Chung-hwa; Ha Do-kwon; Heo Young-ji	Salimchae Korean House (Songchon-dong, Paju, Gyeonggi Province)	Jae-suk Team (Yoo Jae-suk, Haha, Ji Suk-jin, Jeon So-min, Cha Chung-hwa)	Jong-kook Team (Kim Jong-kook, Song Ji-hyo, Yang Se-chan, Ha Do-kwon, Heo Young-ji)	Being the fastest team to finish cooking three sets of food using eggs but without being the bottom with the least eggs to avoid from being the candidates with the losing team's members to receive penalty	Jong-kook Team Wins; Kim Jong-kook, Yang Se-chan, Ha Do-kwon and Heo Young-ji each received the higher grade body wash and lotion present. Song Ji-hyo, who had the least eggs at the end of the race would be the candidates with Jae-suk Team who was the losing team. Through a voting, Haha, Ji Suk-jin and Jeon So-min received the following filming penalty on SBS Entertainment Awards Day.
585 (Note: Yoo Jae-suk did not participate in this episode because of his positive COVID-19 test.) (Note: SBS Entertainment Awards 2021 Special Theme)	December 19, 2021 (December 7, 2021)	Running Man Year-end Closing Special (런닝맨 연말 결산 특집)	Cha Chung-hwa; Ha Do-kwon; Heo Young-ji	Salimchae Korean House (Songchon-dong, Paju, Gyeonggi Province)	Jae-suk Team (Yoo Jae-suk, Haha, Ji Suk-jin, Jeon So-min, Cha Chung-hwa)	Jong-kook Team (Kim Jong-kook, Song Ji-hyo, Yang Se-chan, Ha Do-kwon, Heo Young-ji)	Being the fastest team to finish cooking three sets of food using eggs but without being the bottom with the least eggs to avoid from being the candidates with the losing team's members to receive penalty	Jong-kook Team Wins; Kim Jong-kook, Yang Se-chan, Ha Do-kwon and Heo Young-ji each received the higher grade body wash and lotion present. Song Ji-hyo, who had the least eggs at the end of the race would be the candidates with Jae-suk Team who was the losing team. Through a voting, Haha, Ji Suk-jin and Jeon So-min received the following filming penalty on SBS Entertainment Awards Day.
585	December 26, 2021 (December 7 & 13, 2021)	Running Man Year-end Closing Special (런닝맨 연말 결산 특집)	No Guests	TBC	No Teams		TBC	The results will be revealed on the next episode [See ep. 586 List of Running Man episodes (2022)].

== Viewership ==
Average TV viewership ratings
Ep.	Original broadcast date	Nielsen Korea		TNmS
Ep.	Original broadcast date	Nationwide	Seoul	Nationwide
536	January 3, 2021	7.6% (19th)	8.4% (16th)	7.5% (16th)
537	January 10, 2021	7.0% (20th)	7.3% (19th)	6.8% (20th)
538	January 17, 2021	7.9% (16th)	8.2% (15th)	8.2% (16th)
539	January 24, 2021	6.7% (18th)	6.6% (17th)	8.2% (13th)
540	January 31, 2021	6.4% (20th)	6.5% (20th)	7.0% (16th)
541	February 7, 2021	5.7% (22nd)	—	7.1% (16th)
542	February 14, 2021	6.3% (19th)	—	7.5% (16th)
543	February 21, 2021	5.7% (20th)	—	7.2% (15th)
544	February 28, 2021	6.2% (16th)	6.0% (16th)	6.7% (16th)
545	March 7, 2021	5.8% (19th)	6.1% (20th)	7.1% (16th)
546	March 14, 2021	5.2% (24th)	—	7.2% (16th)
547	March 21, 2021	6.8% (14th)	6.7% (17th)	5.6% (18th)
548	March 28, 2021	6.3% (16th)	6.9% (16th)	7.8% (12th)
549	April 4, 2021	5.9% (20th)	—	6.6% (17th)
550	April 11, 2021	5.6% (18th)	—	7.3% (14th)
551	April 18, 2021	6.4% (17th)	6.9% (17th)	6.9% (15th)
552	April 25, 2021	5.6% (18th)	5.8% (19th)	7.4% (13th)
553	May 2, 2021	5.4% (17th)	5.4% (19th)	7.0% (14th)
554	May 9, 2021	6.0% (15th)	5.8% (17th)	6.0% (17th)
555	May 16, 2021	6.5% (19th)	6.7% (18th)	7.0% (15th)
556	May 23, 2021	5.6% (20th)	5.8% (18th)	6.6% (14th)
557	May 30, 2021	6.7% (15th)	5.3% (19th)	7.0% (13th)
558	June 6, 2021	6.4% (12th)	6.7% (10th)	6.4% (13th)
559	June 13, 2021	6.0% (18th)	5.9% (16th)	6.8% (13th)
560	June 20, 2021	5.3% (18th)	5.9% (16th)	6.7% (13th)
561	June 27, 2021	5.6% (17th)	—	6.2% (13th)
562	July 4, 2021	5.6% (12th)	5.8% (9th)	6.0% (10th)
563	July 11, 2021	4.6% (16th)	4.7% (19th)	5.7% (12th)
564	July 18, 2021	4.8% (19th)	4.8% (19th)	6.2% (11th)
565	August 8, 2021	5.2% (19th)	5.4% (16th)	6.8% (8th)
566	August 15, 2021	4.9% (11th)	5.5% (9th)	5.2% (12th)
567	August 22, 2021	5.2% (16th)	5.3% (14th)	5.5% (11th)
568	August 29, 2021	4.6% (18th)	4.8% (16th)	5.1% (14th)
569	September 5, 2021	4.6% (16th)	4.8% (15th)	5.6% (9th)
570	September 12, 2021	4.2% (16th)	4.2% (16th)	4.9% (12th)
571	September 19, 2021	4.3% (17th)	4.5% (18th)	4.4% (15th)
572	September 26, 2021	5.9% (9th)	6.3% (8th)	
573	October 3, 2021	5.5% (9th)	5.9% (8th)	5.1% (13th)
574	October 10, 2021	4.6% (13th)	5.3% (12th)	5.4% (9th)
575	October 17, 2021	5.1% (11th)	5.2% (12th)	5.6% (7th)
576	October 24, 2021	5.2% (11th)	5.9% (8th)	6.0% (9th)
577	October 31, 2021	4.6% (14th)	5.0% (12th)	5.3% (13th)
578	November 7, 2021	4.9% (10th)	5.0% (10th)	6.6% (6th)
579	November 14, 2021	4.4% (14th)	4.9% (12th)	5.4% (10th)
580	November 21, 2021	5.3% (10th)	5.8% (7th)	5.7% (10th)
581	November 28, 2021	4.7% (14th)	5.0% (13th)	5.2% (9th)
582	December 5, 2021	4.5% (16th)	4.6% (15th)	5.5% (12th)
583	December 12, 2021	4.7% (17th)	5.1% (14th)	4.9% (16th)
584	December 19, 2021	5.2% (15th)	5.7% (13th)	5.4% (15th)
585	December 26, 2021	5.4% (14th)	5.8% (11th)	5.4% (14th)
TNmS ratings listed is the highest ratings amongst ratings for each episodes.; "—" denotes episode didn't enter top 20 in Nielsen Korea and TNmS ratings.
