= Juja-dong =

Neighbourhood in Seoul, South Korea

- Interactive map of Juja-dong
- Country: South Korea

Area
  - Total: 0.02 km^{2} (0.0077 sq mi)

Korean name
- Hangul: 주자동
- Hanja: 鑄字洞
- RR: Juja-dong
- MR: Chuja-dong

Juja-dong (Korean: 주자동) is a legal dong (neighbourhood) of Jung District, Seoul, Seoul, South Korea. It is governed by its administrative dong, Pil-dong.

== See also ==
- Administrative divisions of South Korea
