= Namhak-dong =

Neighbourhood in Seoul, South Korea

- Country: South Korea

Korean name
- Hangul: 남학동
- Hanja: 南學洞
- RR: Namhak-dong
- MR: Namhak-tong

Namhak-dong (Korean: 남학동) is a legal dong, or neighbourhood of the Jung District, Seoul, South Korea and governed by its administrative dong, Pil-dong.

== See also ==
- Administrative divisions of South Korea
