= List of Running Man episodes (2022) =

- No. of episodes: 49

Release
- Original network: SBS
- Original release: January 2 – December 25, 2022

Season chronology
- ← Previous; 2021 Next → 2023

This is a list of episodes of the South Korean variety show Running Man in 2022. The show airs on SBS as part of their Good Sunday lineup.

== Episodes ==
List of episodes broadcast in 2022 (586–634)
Ep.	Airdate (Filming date)	Title	Guest(s)	Teams		Mission	Results	Ref.
586 (Note: Yoo Jae-suk returned after recovery from COVID-19 infection.)	January 2, 2022 (December 13 & 26, 2021)	Renyin Year: Duplicate Loan Race (임인년－복채대출 레이스)	No guests	No teams		Complete the mission given to get money to pay ₩ 7,000,000 fortune teller fees before KST 3:00 PM to avoid the penalty	Mission Failed; Kim Jong-kook and Yang Se-chan, who were drawn by the penalty ball, had to film a 1-minute video of themselves watching Running Man. The video was then aired at KST 5:00PM as a penalty.	
587	January 9, 2022 (December 27, 2021)	The Seniority War of The Youngest Members (막내들의 서열전쟁)	No guests	Musical Chairs with No Hierarchy; Jeon So-min Team (Jeon So-min, Yoo Jae-suk, Ji Suk-jin); Yang Se-chan Team (Yang Se-chan, Haha, Kim Jong-kook, Song Ji-hyo); The Youngest's Winning Game; Jeon So-min Team (Jeon So-min, Yoo Jae-suk, Kim Jong-kook); Yang Se-chan Team (Yang Se-chan, Haha, Ji Suk-jin, Song Ji-hyo)	Final Pick; Jeon So-min Team (Jeon So-min, Haha, Song Ji-hyo); Yang Se-chan Team (Yang Se-chan, Yoo Jae-suk, Ji Suk-jin, Kim Jong-kook)	The Youngest Member's Mission; Have the fewest votes to avoid being "The Youngest" and to avoid the penalty Older Member's Mission; Be the top 2 with the winner's coin or not being chosen by the youngest to avoid the penalty	Yoo Jae-suk, Kim Jong-kook and Yang Se-chan Wins; Jeon So-min was crowned the "2022's Youngest Member of Running Man" and chose Song Ji-hyo to shoot the preview for this episode together as a penalty after the filming.	
588	January 16, 2022 (January 10, 2022)	"Height" Point ('키'포인트)	Irene Kim; Joo Woo-jae; Lee Hyun-yi; Song Hae-na	Tall Team (Yoo Jae-suk, Kim Jong-kook, Irene Kim, Lee Hyun-yi); Short Team (Haha, Song Ji-hyo, Song Hae-na); Average Team (Ji Suk-jin, Jeon So-min, Yang Se-chan, Joo Woo-jae)		Being the tallest team to receive a prize and not being the shortest among teams to avoid the penalty	Tall Team Wins; The members of Tall Team each received a Korean beef set. Song Hae-na, who was the shortest along with Song Ji-hyo and Jeon So-min, was exempted from the penalty through luck. Song Ji-hyo and Jeon So-min received the whipped cream penalty.	
589	January 23, 2022 (January 10 & 17 2022)	"Height" Point ('키'포인트)	Irene Kim; Joo Woo-jae; Lee Hyun-yi; Song Hae-na	Tall Team (Yoo Jae-suk, Kim Jong-kook, Irene Kim, Lee Hyun-yi); Short Team (Haha, Song Ji-hyo, Song Hae-na); Average Team (Ji Suk-jin, Jeon So-min, Yang Se-chan, Joo Woo-jae)		Being the tallest team to receive a prize and not being the shortest among teams to avoid the penalty	Tall Team Wins; The members of Tall Team each received a Korean beef set. Song Hae-na, who was the shortest along with Song Ji-hyo and Jeon So-min, was exempted from the penalty through luck. Song Ji-hyo and Jeon So-min received the whipped cream penalty.	
589	January 23, 2022 (January 10 & 17 2022)	Renyin Year's Tangun Myth (임인년 단군신화)	Bae Seul-ki; Eunhyuk (Super Junior); Hong Soo-ah	Mission Team (Yoo Jae-suk, Haha, Kim Jong-kook, Song Ji-hyo, Jeon So-min, Yang Se-chan, Bae Seul-ki, Hong Soo-ah)	Poachers (Ji Suk-jin, Eunhyuk)	Being the top three with the most garlic cloves to receive a prize or avoid being the bottom three with the fewest garlic cloves to get a penalty	Ji Suk-jin, Bae Seul-ki and Eunhyuk Wins; Ji Suk-jin, Bae Seul-ki and Eunhyuk each received a barley croaker and king ribs set. Kim Jong-kook, Jeon So-min and Hong Soo-ah, who were the bottom three with the fewest garlic cloves, had to mince the garlic after the filming as a penalty.	
590	January 30, 2022 (January 17, 2022)	Renyin Year's Tangun Myth Part.2 (임인년 단군신화 II)	Bae Seul-ki; Eunhyuk (Super Junior); Hong Soo-ah	Mission Team (Yoo Jae-suk, Haha, Kim Jong-kook, Song Ji-hyo, Jeon So-min, Yang Se-chan, Bae Seul-ki, Hong Soo-ah)	Poachers (Ji Suk-jin, Eunhyuk)	Being the top three with the most garlic cloves to receive a prize or avoid being the bottom three with the fewest garlic cloves to get a penalty	Ji Suk-jin, Bae Seul-ki and Eunhyuk Wins; Ji Suk-jin, Bae Seul-ki and Eunhyuk each received a barley croaker and king ribs set. Kim Jong-kook, Jeon So-min and Hong Soo-ah, who were the bottom three with the fewest garlic cloves, had to mince the garlic after the filming as a penalty.	
591 (Note: Song Ji-hyo did not attend the filming due to relapse from childhood allergy.) (Note: Jeon So-min did not attend the filming due to recovery from recent surgery.)	February 6, 2022 (January 24, 2022)	Se-ri and Birdie Buddy (세리와 버디버디)	Park Se-ri	Old Man Team (Yoo Jae-suk, Ji Suk-jin, Kim Jong-kook)	Park Se-ri Team (Park Se-ri, Haha, Yang Se-chan)	Collect enough money to buy the prize and buy the Penalty Exemption Card to avoid the penalty	Yoo Jae-suk, Haha, Ji Suk-jin and Kim Jong-kook Wins; Yoo Jae-suk, Haha, Ji Suk-jin and Kim Jong-kook each purchased a penalty exemption card and were exempted from the penalty. Haha uses his leftover money to buy the Korean pork set. Yang Se-chan uses his money to buy the coach's penalty ticket. Park Se-ri uses her money to buy two of the waffle maker and dough set, one of which was given to Yoo Jae-Suk. Yang Se-Chan and Park Se-ri played another match at the velcro golf course before going home as a penalty.	
592	February 20, 2022 (January 25, 2022)	The Tazza Association: People Who Read The Minds of Scammers (타짜 협회－꾼의 마음을 읽는 자들)	Joo Woo-jae	No teams		Being the Top 2 with the most caramel to receive a prize and avoid being chosen by the winner to avoid the penalty	Haha and Joo Woo-jae Wins; Haha and Joo Woo-jae each received the yokan gold bars (red jelly bean confectionery) present. Yang Se-chan was chosen by Haha to receive the absorbent tissue slap penalty by other members.	
593 (Note: Yang Se-chan did not participate in this episode due to COVID-19 infection.)	February 27, 2022 (February 7, 2022)	Casual Ji (JI 편한대로)	KCM; Parc Jae-jung; Wonstein (MSG Wannabe)	PFC and Gomoku Game; Others Team (Yoo Jae-suk, Haha, Jeon So-min, KCM); Ji Team (Ji Suk-jin, Kim Jong-kook, Song Ji-hyo, Parc Jae-jung, Wonstein)	Do You Want To Hear The Song Game; Others Team (Yoo Jae-suk, Haha, Kim Jong-kook, Song Ji-hyo); Ji Team (Ji Suk-jin, Jeon So-Min, KCM, Parc Jae-jung, Wonstein)	Being the Top 2 to receive a prize and avoid being chosen by the winner to avoid the penalty or guessing the composition members of Team Ji which was picked by Ji Suk-jin to avoid the penalty (Note: Ji Suk-jin will spin the roulette to determine whether he will receive the prize or the penalty. If the roulette stops at prize, then, he and the top one will receive the prize while the other two members chosen by the winner and Ji Suk-jin will receive the penalty. If the roulette stops at the penalty, the top two members will receive the prize and one member chosen by the winner along with Ji Suk-jin will receive the penalty.)	Ji Suk-jin and Wonstein Wins; Ji Suk-jin and Wonstein each received a lamb set as a prize. Parc Jae-jung was exempt from the penalty because he was in the top two. Yoo Jae-suk, Haha, Kim Jong-kook and KCM were also exempt from the penalty as they correctly guessed the members of Team Ji and received penalty exemption cards. Song Ji-hyo and Jeon So-min, the remaining members, flicked each other's nose as a penalty.	
594	March 6, 2022 (February 21, 2022)	Running Man General Election Race (런닝맨 대선 레이스)	Jo Se-ho	Candidates (Yoo Jae-suk, Haha, Ji Suk-jin, Kim Jong-kook, Jeon So-min, Yang Se-chan); Resigned Candidates (Song Ji-hyo, Jo Se-ho)		Have the most votes to be elected as the captain of Running Man	Ji Suk-jin Wins; Ji Suk-jin was elected as the captain of Running Man. He will be the captain for one month, getting the privilege of appearing at the beginning of the show alongside the show's rating notice, and having Running Man's logo changed to "Ji Suk-jin's Running Man" during his term. Final Standings: Rank / Player / Votes; 1 / Ji Suk-jin / 22; 2 / Haha / 21; 3 / Jeon So-min / 13; 4 / Yoo Jae-suk / 5; 5 / Kim Jong-kook / 4; 6 / Yang Se-chan / 3; 7 / Song Ji-hyo / Resigned; 7 / Jo Se-ho / Resigned	
595	March 13, 2022 (February 28, 2022)	Because Thie Is The First Time in My Life as a Team Leader (이번 생에 팀장은 처음이라)	Cha Jun-hwan; Jin Ji-hee	This Is Darn Your Memory; Cha Jun-hwan Team (Cha Jun-hwan, Yoo Jae-suk, Jeon So-min, Yang Se-chan); Jin Ji-hee Team (Jin Ji-hee, Haha, Ji Suk-jin, Kim Jong-kook, Song Ji-hyo); Sticky Slap Match; Cha Jun-hwan Team (Cha Jun-hwan, Yoo Jae-suk, Ji Suk-jin, Jeon So-min, Yang Se-chan); Jin Ji-hee Team (Jin Ji-hee, Haha, Kim Jong-kook, Song Ji-hyo)	Blind Hide and Seek; Cha Jun-hwan Team (Cha Jun-hwan, Yoo Jae-suk, Ji Suk-jin, Yang Se-chan); Jin Ji-hee Team (Jin Ji-hee, Haha, Kim Jong-kook, Song Ji-hyo, Jeon So-min)	Have the highest amount of money at the end of the race to be the winner.	Yang Se-chan and Jin Ji-hee Wins; Yang Se-chan and Jin Ji-hee each received a Korean beef set as their prizes. Haha was chosen by the roulette to strip-wax his hands as a penalty.	
596	March 27, 2022 (February 28 & March 7, 2022)	Because Thie Is The First Time in My Life as a Team Leader (이번 생에 팀장은 처음이라)	Cha Jun-hwan; Jin Ji-hee	This Is Darn Your Memory; Cha Jun-hwan Team (Cha Jun-hwan, Yoo Jae-suk, Jeon So-min, Yang Se-chan); Jin Ji-hee Team (Jin Ji-hee, Haha, Ji Suk-jin, Kim Jong-kook, Song Ji-hyo); Sticky Slap Match; Cha Jun-hwan Team (Cha Jun-hwan, Yoo Jae-suk, Ji Suk-jin, Jeon So-min, Yang Se-chan); Jin Ji-hee Team (Jin Ji-hee, Haha, Kim Jong-kook, Song Ji-hyo)	Blind Hide and Seek; Cha Jun-hwan Team (Cha Jun-hwan, Yoo Jae-suk, Ji Suk-jin, Yang Se-chan); Jin Ji-hee Team (Jin Ji-hee, Haha, Kim Jong-kook, Song Ji-hyo, Jeon So-min)	Have the highest amount of money at the end of the race to be the winner.	Yang Se-chan and Jin Ji-hee Wins; Yang Se-chan and Jin Ji-hee each received a Korean beef set as their prizes. Haha was chosen by the roulette to strip-wax his hands as a penalty.	
596	March 27, 2022 (February 28 & March 7, 2022)	BTOB Special without BTOB (비투비 없는 비투비 특집)	No guests	Type B Team (Yoo Jae-suk, Haha, Yang Se-chan)	Type A & AB Team (Ji Suk-jin, Kim Jong-kook, Song Ji-hyo, Jeon So-min)	Without the team penalty ball draws by Production Team	Type A & AB Team Wins; Type B Team received the water bomb penalty.	
597	April 3, 2022 (March 14, 2022)	No Spring Sugar Penalty (봄 사탕 벌칙 말고)	Kim Hee-jung; Park Ah-in; Roh Jeong-eui	Female Group (Yoo Jae-suk, Song Ji-hyo, Kim Hee-jung, Park Ah-in, Roh Jeong-eui); Male Group (Haha, Ji Suk-jin, Kim Jong-kook, Jeon So-min, Yang Se-chan)		Being the Top with the fewest penalty ball on female and male group respectively to receive prizes but without having the most penalty ball to avoid penalty	Jeon So-min & Roh Jeong-eui Wins; Jeon So-min and Roh Jeong-eui each received a famous necktie and a scarf respectively. Yoo Jae-suk and Ji Suk-jin, who had the most penalty balls out of the female and male groups respectively, produced a bouquet and gave it to their family after the filming as a penalty.	
598	April 10, 2022 (March 28, 2022)	Leader Ji's: Imagination Becomes Reality (지 대장의－상상은 현실이 된다)	No guests	No teams		Without penalty balls were drawn by leader Ji Suk-jin to avoid penalty	Haha, Kim Jong-kook, Song Ji-hyo & Jeon So-min Wins; Yoo Jae-suk, Ji Suk-jin and Yang Se-chan, whose penalty balls were drawn, had to enter a river as a penalty.	
599	April 17, 2022 (April 4, 2022)	How Much Do You Want? (얼마를 긁고 싶을까?)	No guests	No teams		Being the one with the least amount of money without being broke or have more than ₩ 10,000	Kim Jong-kook Wins; Song Ji-hyo was chosen to buy things with her personal card while wearing cangue through the game of luck after the filming as a penalty.	
600 (Note: 600th Episode special)	April 24, 2022 (April 11, 2022)	Along With You (님과 함께)	No guests	No teams		Being the candidate to being a winner chosen by Running Man members but without being the candidate to get penalty chosen by the production staff	Song Ji-hyo Wins; Song Ji-hyo was responsible for the doner's representative through the game of luck. Ji Suk-jin had to write a thankful letter representing Running Man's members and production team through the game of luck after the filming as a penalty.	
601	May 1, 2022 (April 18, 2022)	The Decisive Punch (결정적 한 빵)	Byeon Woo-seok; Joo Woo-jae; Park Kyung-hye	Woo-seok Team (Byeon Woo-seok, Yoo Jae-suk, Ji Suk-jin, Jeon So-min); Kyung-hye Team (Park Kyung-hye, Haha, Yang Se-chan); Woo-jae Team (Joo Woo-jae, Kim Jong-kook, Song Ji-hyo)		Being the first team to collects all ten kind of Runningmon stickers	Kyung-hye Team Wins	
602	May 8, 2022 (April 25, 2022)	Scoundrels Come Slowly (앙숙들 차차차)	Cho Jun-ho; Cho Jun-hyun; Hyoyeon; Yuri (Girls' Generation)	Lower Village (Yoo Jae-suk, Jeon So-min, Yang Se-chan, Cho Jun-hyun, Yuri); Upper Village (Haha, Ji Suk-jin, Song Ji-hyo, Cho Jun-ho, Hyoyeon); Birthday Boy (Kim Jong-kook)		Being the Top two with the highest amount to receive prizes but without being the bottom two to avoid penalty	Haha & Kim Jong-kook Wins; Haha and Kim Jong-kook each received the highest grade honey gift set. Yoo Jae-suk and Yang Se-chan, who were the bottom two, had to participate in the filming of the next episode one hour early as a penalty.	
603	May 15, 2022 (May 2, 2022)	1st 1/N Game (제1회 1/N 게임)	No guests	No teams		Being the last member to survive through six missions	Yoo Jae-suk Wins; Jeon So-min, whose penalty ball was drawn by the production team, received the whipped cream penalty.	
604	May 22, 2022 (May 9, 2022)	Instruction for Using Black and White Rose (흑백장미 사용설명서)	Cha Eun-woo; Moonbin; Yoon San-ha (Astro)	White Heart Team (Song Ji-hyo, Yoo Jae-suk, Haha, Ji Suk-jin, Kim Jong-kook)	Black Heart Team (Jeon So-min, Yang Se-chan, Cha Eun-woo, Moonbin, Yoon San-ha)	Leader's Mission; Win with the highest votes to avoid penalty. Male Member's Mission; Being the top two with the most roses to receive prizes but without being the bottom two with the fewest roses to avoid penalty	Yoo Jae-suk, Song Ji-hyo and Moonbin Wins; Yoo Jae-suk and Moonbin each received the Korean beef set. Song Ji-hyo was exempt from the penalty after receiving the highest number of votes. Ji Suk-jin and Yang Se-chan, who were the bottom two male members with the fewest roses, and Jeon So-min, who had the lowest votes, received the water, flower petals, and black ink shower penalty respectively.	
605	May 29, 2022 (May 16, 2022)	2022: Truth or Guilt (이공이이: 진실 혹은 누명)	Hong Ye-ji; Hwang Seok-jeong; Kim Ji-young	Chaser Team (Yoo Jae-suk, Ji Suk-jin, Kim Jong-kook, Song Ji-hyo, Jeon So-min, Yang Se-chan, Hong Ye-ji, Hwang Seok-jeong, Kim Ji-young)	Criminal (Haha)	Criminal's Mission; Without being apprehend by Chaser Team to receive prizes and avoid penalty Chaser Team's Mission; Identify and apprehend Criminal to receive prizes	Haha Wins	
606	June 5, 2022 (May 23, 2022)	Masters of Investment: Go to NY (투자의 귀재들: Go to NY)	Heo Young-ji; Jo Se-ho	No teams		Being the Top two with the highest amount to receive prizes or without being the bottom with the lowest amount to avoid penalty	Yoo Jae-suk and Ji Suk-jin Wins; Yoo Jae-suk received the black Angus beef and LA Ribs gift sets, Ji Suk-jin received the LA Ribs gift set. Jo Se-ho, who was the bottom with the lowest amount, has to write an apology letter in English as a penalty. Final Standings: Rank / Player / Final Amount (₩1,000,000); 1 / Yoo Jae-suk / 51.82; 2 / Ji Suk-jin / 39.6; 3 / Yang Se-chan / 15.84; 4 / Haha / 12.65; 5 / Jeon So-min / 9.48; 6 / Kim Jong-kook / 4.76; 7 / Heo Young-ji / 2.2; 8 / Song Ji-hyo / 1.608; 9 / Jo Se-ho / 0.72	
607	June 12, 2022 (May 23, 2022)	Masters of Investment: Go to NY Part II (투자의 귀재들: Go to NY II)	Heo Young-ji; Jo Se-ho	No teams		Being the Top two with the highest amount to receive prizes or without being the bottom with the lowest amount to avoid penalty		
608	June 19, 2022 (June 6, 2022)	I Got Off Work First (먼저 퇴근하겠습니다)	No guests	No teams		To get off the work early and avoid overtime work	Haha, Ji Suk-jin, Kim Jong-kook, Song Ji-hyo, Jeon So-min and Yang Se-chan Wins; Yang Se-chan was the first to get off the work. Yoo Jae-suk must work overtime as penalty.	
609	June 26, 2022 (June 13, 2022)	The 1st Running Man Proxy Vacance (제1회 런닝맨 대행 바캉스)	No guests	No teams		No Mission	Everyone Wins	
610	July 3, 2022 (June 20, 2022)	Home Jong-kook (집종국)	No guests	Mission Team (Yoo Jae-suk, Ji Suk-jin, Haha, Song Ji-hyo, Jeon So-min, Yang Se-chan); Host (Kim Jong-kook)		Have the drop change for stress level measurement or avoid being picked for penalty	Haha, Ji Suk-jin, Song Ji-hyo, Jeon So-min and Yang Se-chan Wins; Kim Jong-kook received housewarming party gift certificate from Production Team. Yoo Jae-suk was chosen through a game of luck to sing 3 songs alone in a karaoke after the filming as a penalty, but Jeon So-min bought the penalty for ₩60,000 and she performed it instead.	
611	July 10, 2022 (June 27, 2022)	The Rice Spoon War (밥숟가락 전쟁)	KCM; Mirani; Park Cho-rong; Yoon Bo-mi (Apink)	ChoBom Team (Park Cho-rong, Yoon Bo-mi, Yoo Jae-suk, Haha, Jeon So-min, Yang Se-chan)	Kook & Myun Team (Kim Jong-kook, KCM, Ji Suk-jin, Song Ji-hyo, Mirani)	Avoid being chosen by the roulette to avoid penalty	Kook & Myun Team Wins; ChoBom Team was chosen by the roulette to do the penalty. Yoo Jae-suk, Haha and Jeon So-min received the shredded paper penalty while Yang Se-chan, Park Cho-rong and Yoon Bo-mi received the flour penalty.	
612	July 17, 2022 (July 4, 2022)	2nd Witty Sharing Life (제2회 슬기로운 나눔생활)	No guests	No teams		Collect the R coin to choose the penalty	Mission Accomplished; Yoo Jae-suk, Kim Jong-kook and Song Ji-hyo has to drink sophora root tea as a penalty. Haha has to dance the BTS cover in front of the lobby after filming as a penalty. Ji Suk-jin and Jeon So-min received the ink water and water shower penalty respectively. Yang Se-chan received the face rub with black ink on his face as a penalty.	
613 (Note: 12th Anniversary SBS Running Man Special)	July 24, 2022 (July 12, 2022)	Running Biography (런닝전)	No guests	Skit 1 Main Characters (Haha, Ji-Suk-jin, Kim Jong-kook, Song Ji-hyo, Jeon So-min, Yang Se-chan); Corrupt Official (Yoo Jae-suk); Skit 2 Main Characters (Yoo Jae-suk, Haha, Kim Jong-kook, Song Ji-hyo, Jeon So-min, Yang Se-chan); Corrupt Official (Ji Suk-jin); Skit 3 Main Characters (Yoo Jae-suk, Haha, Ji Suk-jin, Song Ji-hyo, Jeon So-min, Yang Se-chan); Corrupt Official (Kim Jong-kook)	Skit 4 Main Characters (Yoo Jae-suk, Haha, Ji Suk-jin, Kim Jong-kook, Song Ji-hyo, Yang Se-chan); Corrupt Official (Jeon So-min); Skit 5 Main Characters (Yoo Jae-suk, Haha, Ji Suk-jin, Kim Jong-kook, Song Ji-hyo, Jeon So-min); Corrupt Official (Yang Se-chan)	Identify and apprehend the corrupt official through series of skits to avoid penalty	Yoo Jae-suk, Kim Jong-kook, and Jeon So-min Wins; Skit 1: Yoo Jae-Suk (corrupt official) wins 60,000₩, Yang Se-Chan slapped with a rice scoop as penalty. Skit 2: Main Characters Wins, Ji Suk-Jin (corrupt official) receives a flogging as penalty. Skit 3: Kim Jong-Kook (corrupt official) wins 10,000₩, Song Ji-Hyo receives leg twist as penalty. Skit 4: Jeon So-Min (corrupt official) wins 100,000₩, Ji Suk-Jin receives water slap as penalty. Skit 5: Main Characters Wins, Yang Se-Chan (corrupt official) has to break a gourd on his head as penalty.	
614	July 31, 2022 (July 18, 2022)	One After Another Running Man (꼬리에 꼬리를 무는 런닝맨)	No guests	No teams		Being the Top 2 with the highest points to receive prizes or without being the Bottom 2 to avoid penalty	Yoo Jae-suk and Yang Se-chan Wins; Yoo Jae-suk and Yang Se-chan each received the highest Korean beef set and gold watermelon set respectively. Ji Suk-jin and Kim Jong-kook, who were the Bottom 2 had to make a tail with civilians after the filming as a penalty.	
615	August 7, 2022 (July 18 & 25, 2022)	One After Another Running Man (꼬리에 꼬리를 무는 런닝맨)	No guests	No teams		Being the Top 2 with the highest points to receive prizes or without being the Bottom 2 to avoid penalty	Yoo Jae-suk and Yang Se-chan Wins; Yoo Jae-suk and Yang Se-chan each received the highest Korean beef set and gold watermelon set respectively. Ji Suk-jin and Kim Jong-kook, who were the Bottom 2 had to make a tail with civilians after the filming as a penalty.	
615	August 7, 2022 (July 18 & 25, 2022)	Three Three Five Five Race (삼삼오오 레이스)	Ha Do-kwon; Joo Woo-jae; Lee Yi-kyung	Yi-kyung Team (Lee Yi-kyung, Yoo Jae-suk, Ji Suk-jin); Woo-jae Team (Joo Woo-jae, Haha, Yang Se-chan); Do-kwon Team (Ha Do-kwon, Kim Jong-kook, Song Ji-hyo); So-min Team (Jeon So-min)	So-min Team (Jeon So-min, Yoo Jae-suk, Haha, Ji Suk-jin, Lee Yi-kyung); Do-kwon Team (Ha Do-kwon, Kim Jong-kook, Song Ji-hyo, Yang Se-chan, Joo Woo-jae)	Be the Top 3 with the most amount to receive a prize or without being the Bottom 2 at the end of the race to avoid penalty	Kim Jong-kook, Jeon So-min and Lee Yi-kyung Wins; Kim Jong-kook, Jeon So-min and Lee Yi-kyung each received the Korean pork set, watermelon & Dyson fan and Korean beef set respectively. Ji Suk-jin and Ha Do-kwon, who were the Bottom 2 had to wear the swimming cap with the pigment water as a penalty.	
616	August 14, 2022 (July 25, 2022)	Three Three Five Five Race Part.2 (삼삼오오 레이스 下)	Ha Do-kwon; Joo Woo-jae; Lee Yi-kyung	Yi-kyung Team (Lee Yi-kyung, Yoo Jae-suk, Ji Suk-jin); Woo-jae Team (Joo Woo-jae, Haha, Yang Se-chan); Do-kwon Team (Ha Do-kwon, Kim Jong-kook, Song Ji-hyo); So-min Team (Jeon So-min)	So-min Team (Jeon So-min, Yoo Jae-suk, Haha, Ji Suk-jin, Lee Yi-kyung); Do-kwon Team (Ha Do-kwon, Kim Jong-kook, Song Ji-hyo, Yang Se-chan, Joo Woo-jae)	Be the Top 3 with the most amount to receive a prize or without being the Bottom 2 at the end of the race to avoid penalty	Kim Jong-kook, Jeon So-min and Lee Yi-kyung Wins; Kim Jong-kook, Jeon So-min and Lee Yi-kyung each received the Korean pork set, watermelon & Dyson fan and Korean beef set respectively. Ji Suk-jin and Ha Do-kwon, who were the Bottom 2 had to wear the swimming cap with the pigment water as a penalty.	
617 (Note: PD Choi Bo-pil Last Episode)	August 21, 2022 (August 1, 2022)	Huge Investments (땅땅거리는 투자)	No guests	No teams		Be the Top 3 with the most amount at the end of the race to avoid penalty	Yoo Jae-suk, Kim Jong-kook and Yang Se-chan Wins; Through a game of luck, Haha and Jeon So-min received the Cola fountain penalty.	
618 (Note: PD Miss Choi Hyung-in First Episode)	August 28, 2022 (August 8, 2022)	War of Coins (엽쩐의 전쟁)	No guests	Human Team (Yoo Jae-suk, Haha, Ji Suk-jin, Kim Jong-kook, Jeon So-min, Yang Se-chan)	Grim Reaper (Song Ji-hyo)	Defeat the other team to avoid receiving 2 penalty stickers.	Yoo Jae-suk and Haha Wins; Song Ji-hyo receives the penalty sticker. Kim Jong-kook, who among the candidate of penalty because turned into ghost with Ji Suk-jin, Jeon So-min and Yang Se-chan, receives the penalty sticker after drawn by the penalty ball, .	
619	September 4, 2022 (August 22, 2022)	Running Man Runs Around (돌고 도는 런닝맨)	No guests	No teams		Defeat the other members to avoid receiving 7 penalty stickers.	Yoo Jae-suk, Kim Jong-kook, Song Ji-hyo and Yang Se-chan Wins; Through the roulette, Haha receives 4 penalty stickers, Ji Suk-jin receives 2 penalty stickers and Jeon So-min receive 1 penalty sticker.	
620 (Note: Chuseok Special) (Note: Fashion Week Special Theme)	September 11, 2022 (August 29, 2022)	My Way with 'Strong' Momentum (기'쎈'마이웨이)	Choi Yeo-jin; Jin Seo-yeon; Ok Ja-yeon	Men's Team (Yoo Jae-suk, Haha, Ji Suk-jin, Kim Jong-kook, Yang Se-chan)	Women's Team (Song Ji-hyo, Jeon So-min, Choi Yeo-jin, Jin Seo-yeon, Ok Ja-yeon)	Defeat the other team to avoid receiving 5 penalty stickers.	Women's Team Wins; Choi Yeo-jin, Jin Seo-yeon and Ok Ja-yeon received the abalone gift set. Yang Se-chan receives 4 penalty stickers and Ji Suk-jin receive 1 penalty sticker.	
621	September 18, 2022 (September 5, 2022)	He Said He Wants to Go to Gangwon-do (강원도 가고 싶드래요)	No guests	Haha Team (Haha, Kim Jong-kook, Song Ji-hyo, Jeon So-min)	Se-chan Team (Yang Se-chan, Yoo Jae-suk, Ji Suk-jin)	Without drew the penalty ball on the funnel to avoid penalty	Yoo Jae-suk, Haha, Ji Suk-jin, Kim Jong-kook and Song Ji-hyo Wins; Jeon So-min and Yang Se-chan each received the Sky Bridge & Trapeze Penalty at Yeosu on next filming episode.	
622 (Note: Only Yang Se-chan and Jeon So-min appeared during the penalty episode.)	September 25, 2022 (September 5 & 13, 2022)	He Said He Wants to Go to Gangwon-do (강원도 가고 싶드래요)	No guests	Haha Team (Haha, Kim Jong-kook, Song Ji-hyo, Jeon So-min)	Se-chan Team (Yang Se-chan, Yoo Jae-suk, Ji Suk-jin)	Without drew the penalty ball on the funnel to avoid penalty	Yoo Jae-suk, Haha, Ji Suk-jin, Kim Jong-kook and Song Ji-hyo Wins; Jeon So-min and Yang Se-chan each received the Sky Bridge & Trapeze Penalty at Yeosu on next filming episode.	
622	September 25, 2022 (September 5 & 13, 2022)	Anyway, The Penalty is... (어차피 벌칙은...)	No guests	No teams		Complete the penalty	Mission Accomplished	
623 (Note: Hangul Special)	October 2, 2022 (September 19, 2022)	Go! Stop!	No guests	No teams		Choose the button between Go or Stop	Haha, Ji Suk-jin, Kim Jong-kook and Yang Se-chan Wins; After choosing the Go button, Yoo Jae-suk, Song Ji-hyo and Jeon So-min will have to take a picture at the flower field as a penalty.	
624	October 9, 2022 (September 19 & 26 2022)	Go! Stop!	No guests	No teams		Choose the button between Go or Stop	Haha, Ji Suk-jin, Kim Jong-kook and Yang Se-chan Wins; After choosing the Go button, Yoo Jae-suk, Song Ji-hyo and Jeon So-min will have to take a picture at the flower field as a penalty.	
624	October 9, 2022 (September 19 & 26 2022)	Expert Run, Have I Eaten The Rice? (런프로, 식사는 잡쉈어?)	No guests	Mission Team (Yoo Jae-suk, Haha, Ji Suk-jin, Kim Jong-kook, Song Ji-hyo, Jeon So-min)	Spy (Yang Se-chan)	Collect as many diamonds to avoid penalty and catch the Spy	Kim Jong-kook and Yang Se-chan Wins; Yoo Jae-suk, Haha, Ji Suk-jin, Song Ji-hyo and Jeon So-min has to guess the correct answer in a locked room in order to go home as a penalty.	
625	October 16, 2022 (October 3, 2022)	Take a Tour Around At a Well-known Neighborhood (유명한 동네 한 바퀴)	No guests	No teams		Eat 3 different dishes before reaching 20,000 steps to go home early and avoid penalty	Everyone Wins	
626	October 23, 2022 (October 11, 2022)	Show Me The Fight Money (SHOW ME THE 파이트 머니)	Manny Pacquiao	No teams		Earn as many as ₩ 600,000 to purchase the penalty exemption card to avoid penalty	Kim Jong kook and Song Ji-hyo Wins; Kim Jong-kook purchases the honey prize with his extra ₩, which he gives to Manny Pacquiao. Yoo Jae-suk, Haha, Ji Suk-jin, Jeon So-min and Yang Se-chan had to chop woods before going home as a penalty.	
627	November 6, 2022 (October 17, 2022)	Suk Jin VS Seok Jin (석진 대 석진)	Jin (BTS)	Jin Team (Jin, Yoo Jae-suk, Haha, Jeon So-min)	Ji Suk-jin Team (Ji Suk-jin, Kim Jong-kook, Song Ji-hyo, Yang Se-chan)	Earn more exchange tickets to have a chance to change teams to avoid penalty.	Ji Suk-jin Team Wins; Haha, Kim Jong-kook, Yang Se-chan and Jin as the final member of Ji Suk-jin team avoided the penalty. Yoo Jae-suk, Ji Suk-jin, Song Ji-hyo and Jeon So-min received the whipped cream penalty.	
628	November 13, 2022 (October 24, 2022)	I'm Finding Autumn (가을을 찾습니다)	No guests	No teams		Obtain the Autumn Clothes before 3:00 pm.	Mission Failed; Yoo Jae-suk, Ji Suk-jin, Kim Jong-kook and Yang Se-chan, who were drawn by the penalty ball had to take a picture in the Sky Bridge of the Lotte World Tower as a penalty.	
629 (Note: Decibel Special Theme)	November 20, 2022 (November 7, 2022)	Combat: Transfer Bombs (작전: 폭탄 돌리기)	Jung Sang-hoon; Kim Rae-won; Park Byung-eun	First Team; Jae-suk Team (Yoo Jae-suk, Song Ji-hyo, Kim Rae-won); Suk-jin Team (Ji Suk-jin, Kim Jong-kook, Yang Se-chan, Jung Sang-hoon); So-min Team (Jeon So-min, Haha, Park Byung-eun); Timer Bomb; Jae-suk Team (Yoo Jae-suk, Song Ji-hyo, Kim Rae-won); Suk-jin Team (Ji Suk-jin, Haha, Yang Se-chan, Jung Sang-hoon); So-min Team (Jeon So-min, Kim Jong-kook, Park Byung-eun); Bomb Designers (Kim Jong-kook, Park Byung-eun)	Final Team; Jae-suk Team (Yoo Jae-suk, Yang Se-chan, Kim Rae-won); Suk-jin Team (Ji Suk-jin, Kim Jong-kook, Jung Sang-hoon, Park Byung-eun); So-min Team (Jeon So-min, Haha, Song Ji-hyo)	Jae-suk Team, Suk-jin Team and So-min Team; Rip the name tag or cut the wire color of the bomb before it explodes Bomb Designers; Cut the wire for other team in every hiding place and shouldn't be together on a same team to win the race.	Jae-suk Team and So-min Team Wins; Jae-suk Team and So-min Team received marinated crab sets as a prize. Suk-jin Team received the water bomb penalty.	
630 (Note: One Dollar Lawyer Special Theme)	November 27, 2022 (November 21, 2022)	One Dollar Lawyer (천원짜리 변호사)	Jo Se-ho; Kim Ji-eun	Appetizer; Jong-kook Team (Kim Jong-kook, Haha); Se-ho Team (Jo Se-ho, Song Ji-hyo, Jeon So-min, Yang Se-chan); Ji-Eun Team (Kim Ji-eun, Yoo Jae-suk, Ji Suk-jin); Main Course; Jong-kook Team (Kim Jong-kook, Haha, Ji Suk-jin, Yang Se-chan); Se-ho Team (Jo Se-ho, Yoo Jae-suk); Ji-Eun Team (Kim Ji-eun, Song Ji-hyo, Jeon So-min)	Dessert; Jong-kook Team (Kim Jong-kook, Haha, Yang Se-chan); Se-ho Team (Jo Se-ho); Ji-Eun Team (Kim Ji-eun, Yoo Jae-suk, Ji Suk-jin, Song Ji-hyo, Jeon So-min); Final Team; Jong-kook Team (Kim Jong-kook, Haha, Song Ji-hyo, Yang Se-chan); Se-ho Team (Jo Se-ho, Jeon So-min); Ji-Eun Team (Kim Ji-eun, Yoo Jae-suk, Ji Suk-jin)	Collect running money to buy a prize.	Kim Jong-kook and Kim Ji-eun Wins; Kim Jong-kook & Kim Ji-eun Team received the natural matsutake gift set as the prizes.	
631 (Note: World Cup Special Theme)	December 4, 2022 (November 28, 2022)	Or First World Cup Win? (월드컵 첫 승 가나?)	No Guests	Jae-suk Team (Yoo Jae-suk, Jeon So-min, Yang Se-chan)	Suk-jin Team (Ji Suk-jin, Haha, Kim Jong-kook, Song Ji-hyo)	Pick more matching lucky number to get a prize.	Ji Suk-jin, Haha, Kim Jong-kook, Song Ji-hyo, and Jeon So-min Wins; Ji Suk-jin, Haha, Kim Jong-kook, Song Ji-hyo, and Jeon So-min each receive a lucky number gift set for getting three matching numbers in the lottery.	
632	December 11, 2022 (November 28 & December 5, 2022)	Or First World Cup Win? (월드컵 첫 승 가나?)	No Guests	Jae-suk Team (Yoo Jae-suk, Jeon So-min, Yang Se-chan)	Suk-jin Team (Ji Suk-jin, Haha, Kim Jong-kook, Song Ji-hyo)	Pick more matching lucky number to get a prize.	Ji Suk-jin, Haha, Kim Jong-kook, Song Ji-hyo, and Jeon So-min Wins; Ji Suk-jin, Haha, Kim Jong-kook, Song Ji-hyo, and Jeon So-min each receive a lucky number gift set for getting three matching numbers in the lottery.	
632	December 11, 2022 (November 28 & December 5, 2022)	The Lucky Number Race (행운의 숫자 레이스)	Be'O; Jukjae	Be'O Team (Be'O, Yoo Jae-suk, Song Ji-hyo); Haha Team (Haha, Jeon So-min, Yang Se-chan); Jukjae Team (Jukjae, Ji Suk-jin, Kim Jong-kook)		Get three star cards or two star cards with a poop card to get the wishes fulfill and avoid getting three poop cards or two poop cards with a star card to avoid the penalty.	Jukjae Team Wins; Be'O Team got the water splash cup as a penalty while Haha Team needs to write a New Year wish card to the members as a penalty.	
633	December 18, 2022 (December 5, 2022)	What's The End of The Year Party (별일 있는 연말 파티)	Be'O; Jukjae	Be'O Team (Be'O, Yoo Jae-suk, Song Ji-hyo); Haha Team (Haha, Jeon So-min, Yang Se-chan); Jukjae Team (Jukjae, Ji Suk-jin, Kim Jong-kook)		Get three star cards or two star cards with a poop card to get the wishes fulfill and avoid getting three poop cards or two poop cards with a star card to avoid the penalty.	Jukjae Team Wins; Be'O Team got the water splash cup as a penalty while Haha Team needs to write a New Year wish card to the members as a penalty.	
634 (Note: Christmas Special)	December 25, 2022 (December 12, 2022)	Yoosanta and The Sixth Rudolph (유산타와 여섯 루돌프)	No Guests	No teams		Complete the missions given to give the presents to the fans.	Mission Accomplished	

== Viewership ==
Running Man : South Korea viewers per episode (thousands)

2022	Episode number												
2022	1	2	3	4	5	6	7	8	9	10	11	12	13
586–598	1171	1284	1166	1097	931	1416	964	1057	1119	1227	1027	980	950
599–611	937	916	745	944	952	762	799	873	745	824	866	977	845
612–624	853	736	909	875	729	860	783	916	764	888	638	824	893
625–637	908	735	1024	949	973	1005	965	873	871	910	–		

Source: Audience measurement performed nationwide by Nielsen Media Research.

Average TV viewership ratings
Ep.	Original broadcast date	Nielsen Korea		TNmS
Ep.	Original broadcast date	Nationwide	Seoul	Nationwide
586	January 2, 2022	5.3% (14th)	5.5% (12th)	4.7% (13th)
587	January 9, 2022	5.8% (10th)	6.0% (10th)	4.7% (13th)
588	January 16, 2022	4.9% (18th)	5.3% (13th)	5.4% (14th)
589	January 23, 2022	4.9% (17th)	5.4% (13th)	4.7% (14th)
590	January 30, 2022	4.3% (18th)	4.8% (9th)	3.5% (17th)
591	February 6, 2022	7.2% (6th)	7.8% (5th)	5.8% (9th)
592	February 20, 2022	4.5% (19th)	4.8% (15th)	4.9% (9th)
593	February 27, 2022	5.2% (11th)	5.9% (9th)	4.7% (15th)
594	March 6, 2022	5.2% (14th)	5.9% (12th)	5.3% (14th)
595	March 13, 2022	5.4% (12th)	5.5% (11th)	4.9% (15th)
596	March 27, 2022	4.5% (17th)	4.6% (17th)	4.8% (13th)
597	April 3, 2022	4.4% (13th)	4.8% (11th)	4.5% (11th)
598	April 10, 2022	4.5% (14th)	4.9% (14th)	N/A
599	April 17, 2022	4.3% (14th)	4.6% (12th)	4.1% (16th)
600	April 24, 2022	4.1% (19th)	4.3% (15th)	4.3% (16th)
601	May 1, 2022	N/A		4.0% (17th)
602	May 8, 2022	4.5% (9th)	5.0% (9th)	4.2% (14th)
603	May 15, 2022	4.5% (10th)	4.7% (8th)	4.8% (9th)
604	May 22, 2022	3.6% (20th)	3.8% (18th)	4.2% (13th)
605	May 29, 2022	N/A	4.0% (13th)	4.3% (15th)
606	June 5, 2022	4.6% (10th)	4.8% (8th)	4.0% (14th)
607	June 12, 2022	3.6% (20th)	4.0% (17th)	3.9% (18th)
608	June 19, 2022	4.0% (17th)	4.4% (14th)	4.2% (14th)
609	June 26, 2022	4.0% (15th)	4.3% (15th)	5.3% (11th)
610	July 3, 2022	4.6% (11th)	5.1% (7th)	4.7% (12th)
611	July 10, 2022	3.9% (20th)	4.1% (14th)	4.7% (11th)
612	July 17, 2022	3.8% (14th)	3.9% (15th)	4.2% (13th)
613	July 24, 2022	N/A	3.9% (14th)	4.6% (13th)
614	July 31, 2022	4.0% (19th)	4.4% (12th)	4.3% (12th)
615	August 7, 2022	4.1% (13th)	4.7% (10th)	N/A
616	August 14, 2022	N/A	3.9% (16th)	3.6% (19th)
617	August 21, 2022	4.0% (16th)	4.7% (10th)	3.7% (17th)
618	August 28, 2022	3.6% (19th)	3.9% (17th)	4.0% (14th)
619	September 4, 2022	4.4% (16th)	5.0% (12th)	4.3% (19th)
620	September 11, 2022	3.5% (18th)	3.9% (13th)	3.4% (19th)
621	September 18, 2022	4.1% (17th)	4.8% (9th)	4.7% (12th)
622	September 25, 2022	N/A		3.6% (19th)
623	October 2, 2022	3.8% (16th)	4.2% (15th)	3.6% (16th)
624	October 9, 2022	3.8% (19th)	4.5% (13th)	4.1% (17th)
625	October 16, 2022	4.4% (12th)	5.0% (9th)	4.4% (13th)
626	October 23, 2022	N/A	3.8% (16th)	4.5% (12th)
627	November 6, 2022	4.8% (9th)	5.0% (8th)	4.0% (14th)
628	November 13, 2022	4.4% (13th)	4.8% (9th)	4.4% (16th)
629	November 20, 2022	4.4% (15th)	4.9% (11th)	4.2% (14th)
630	November 27, 2022	4.9% (15th)	5.4% (13th)	
631	December 4, 2022	4.4% (15th)	4.9% (12th)	
632	December 11, 2022	3.9% (18th)	4.1% (16th)	
633	December 18, 2022	N/A	4.3% (19th)	
634	December 25, 2022	4.2% (16th)	4.7% (13th)	
N/A denotes episode didn't enter top 20 in Nielsen Korea and TNmS ratings.
