= Deungchon-dong =

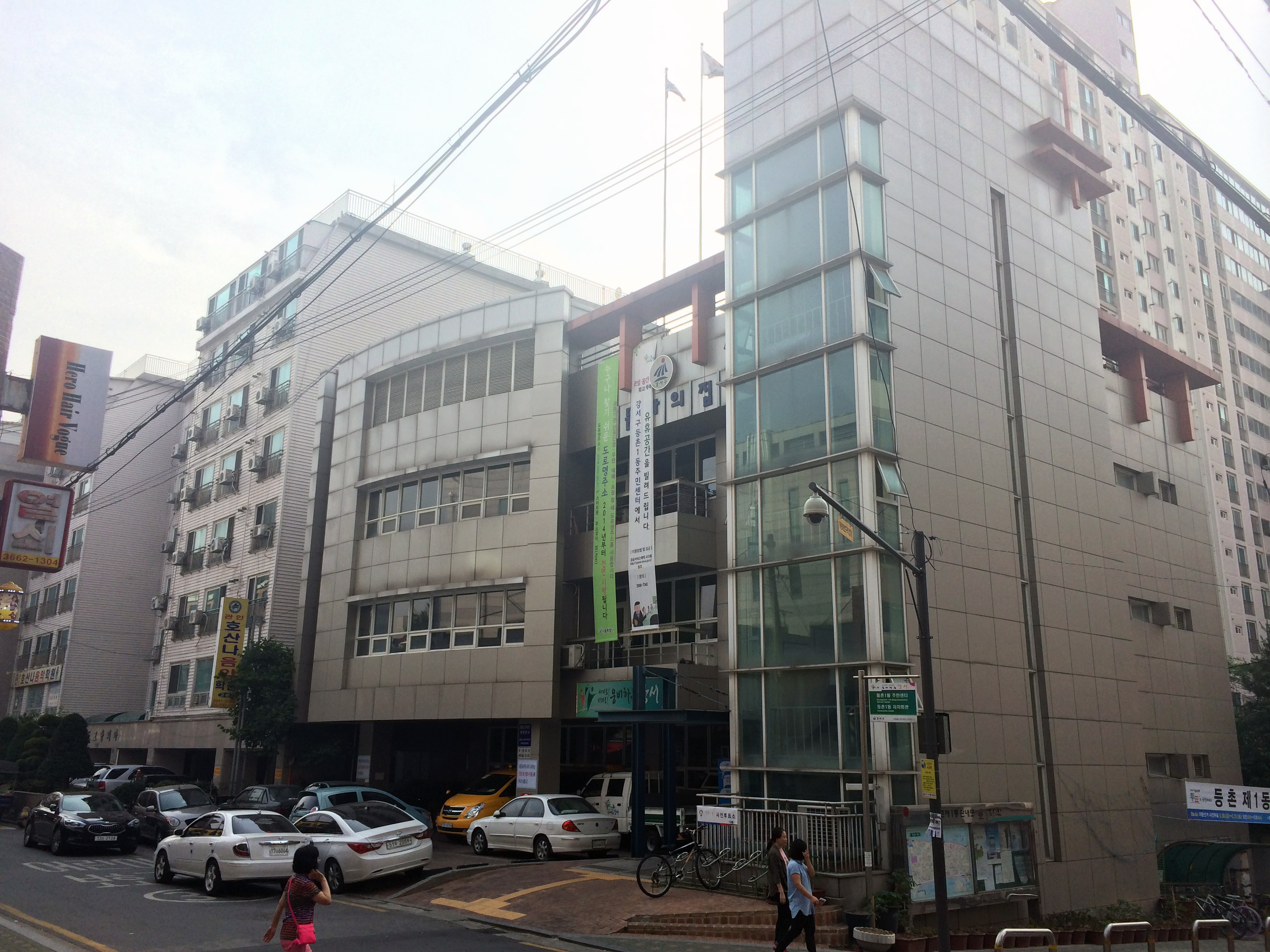
- Deungchon 1-dong Community Service Center
- Interactive map of Deungchon-dong
- Coordinates: 37.55668°N 126.85492°E
- Country: South Korea

Area
  - Total: 2.3 km^{2} (0.89 sq mi)

Population (2001)
  - Total: 74,907
  - Density: 32,568/km^{2} (84,350/sq mi)

Korean name
- Hangul: 등촌동
- Hanja: 登村洞
- RR: Deungchon-dong
- MR: Tŭngch'on-dong

Deungchon-dong (Korean: 등촌동) is a dong (neighborhood) of Gangseo District, Seoul, South Korea.

== Attractions ==
Jin Air has its headquarters in Deungchon-dong.

SBS Open Hall, located in Deungchon-dong, is the broadcast and recording centre of many Seoul Broadcasting System programmes with a studio audience, including the live weekly music show The Music Trend.

== See also ==
- Administrative divisions of South Korea
