= Pil-dong =

Neighbourhood in Seoul, South Korea

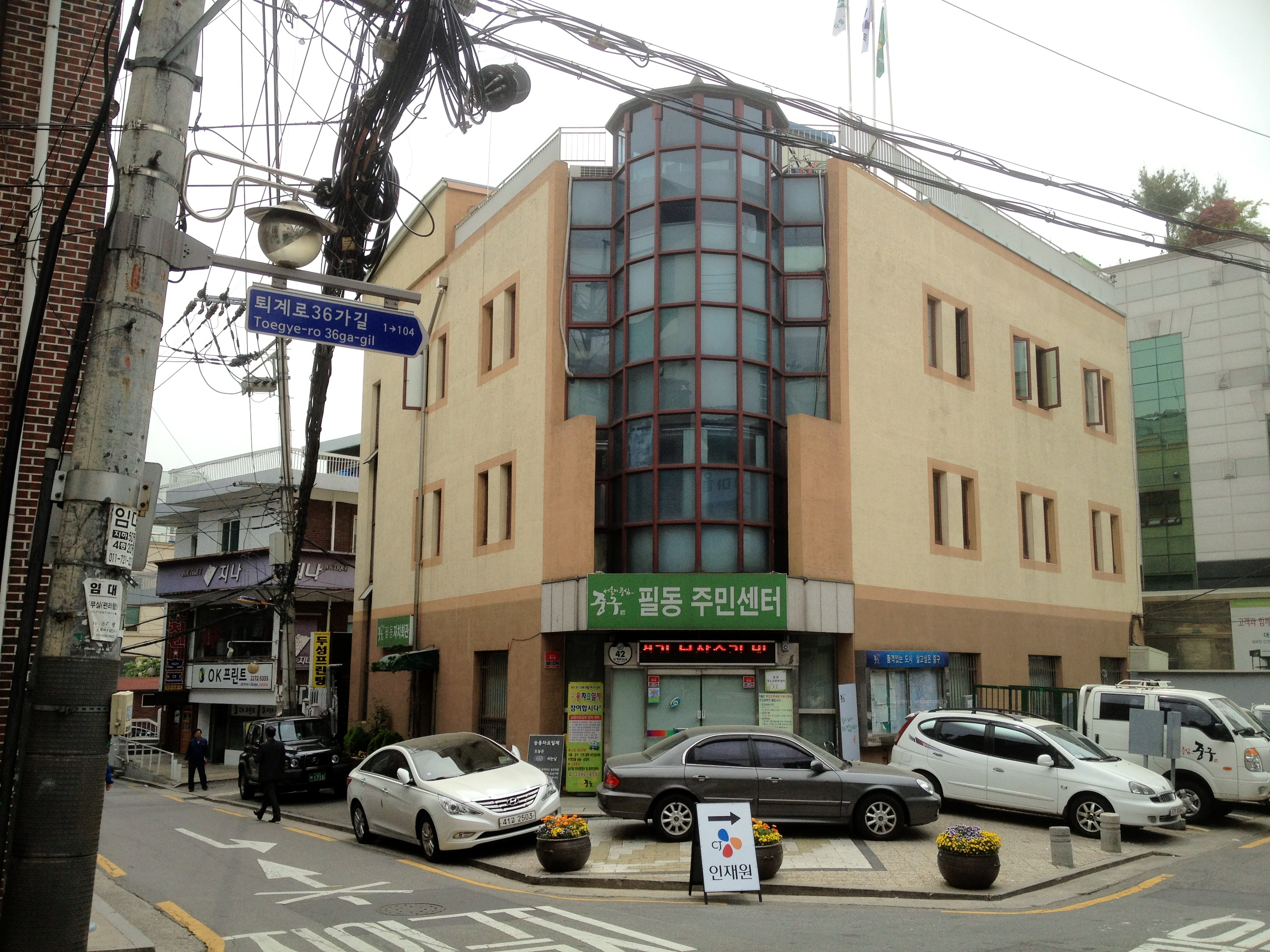
- Pil-dong Resident Office

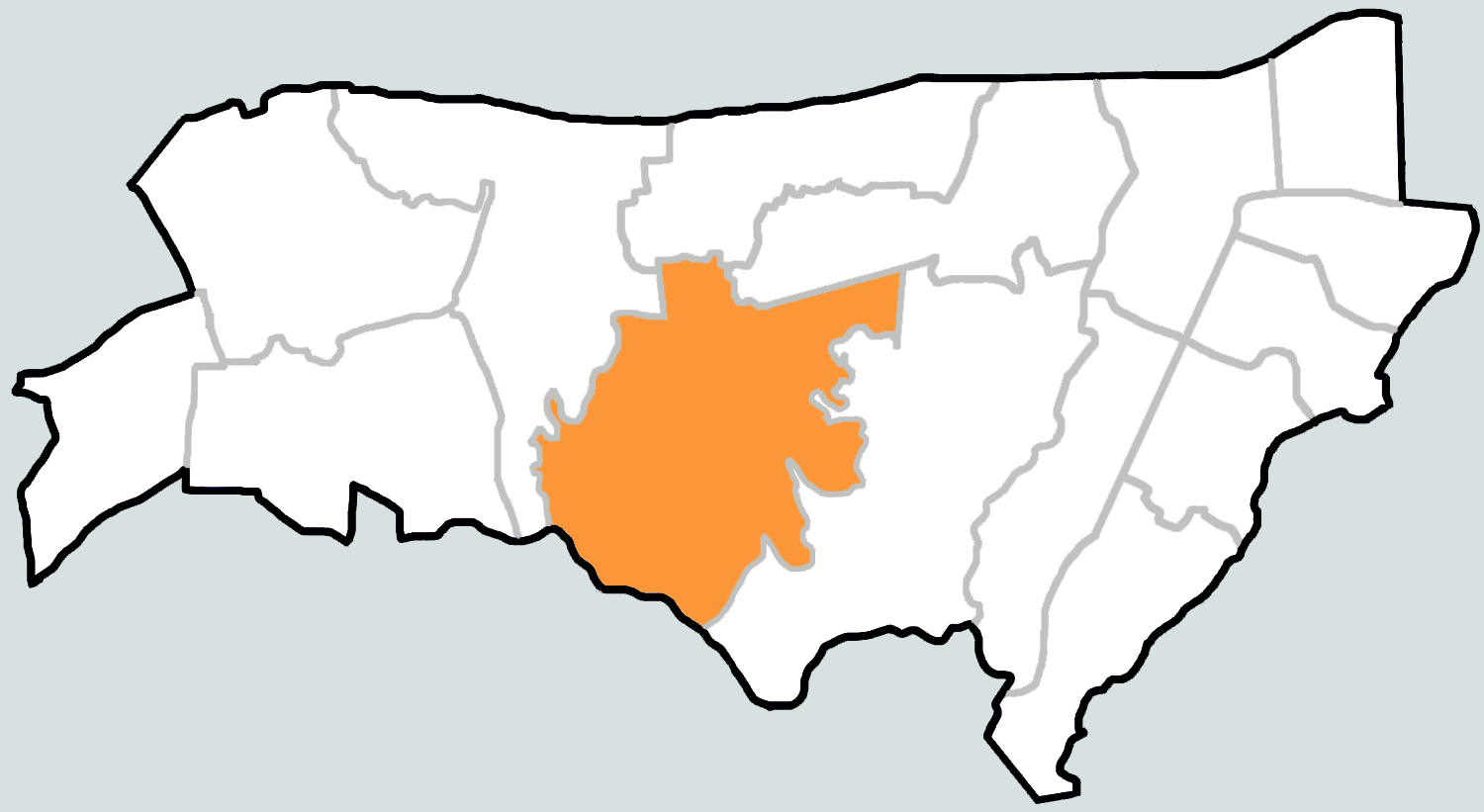
- Country: South Korea

Area
  - Total: 1.14 km^{2} (0.44 sq mi)

Population (2013)
  - Total: 4,454
  - Density: 3,910/km^{2} (10,100/sq mi)

Korean name
- Hangul: 필동
- Hanja: 筆洞
- RR: Pil-dong
- MR: P'il-tong

Pil-dong (Korean: 필동) is a dong (neighbourhood) of Jung District, Seoul, South Korea.

== Overview ==
The name Pil-dong originated from a southern local office called 'Budong' during the Joseon period, which later changed to 'Butgol' and was written in Chinese characters as '필동'. In the early Joseon Dynasty, Pil-dong belonged to Nambug Seongmyeongbang, Nakseonbang, and Hundo-bang areas. During the Japanese occupation, Daehwajeong 1 and Daehwajeong 2-3 were established with the installation of 'Jonghoe'. After liberation in 1946, Pil-dong was divided into Pil-dong 1 District Association and Pil-dong 2-3 District Association for administration purposes.

== Attractions ==
- Hwanghak-dong Flea Market
- Dongguk University
- Sungjeongjeon (숭정전 崇政殿)

== Transportation ==
- Chungmuro Station of and of

== See also ==
- Administrative divisions of South Korea
