= List of songs recorded by VIXX =

Here is a list of songs recorded by the South Korean six-member boy band VIXX and their sub-unit VIXX LR, formed by Jellyfish Entertainment. The credits for the Korean releases are adapted from the official homepage of the group.

Color key

Single Pre-release single

== 0–9 ==
Song	Artist	Lyrics	Music	Album	Language	Year
"1, 2, 3, 4, 5" (다가오네)	VIXX	Ravi	Ravi, PUFF	Shangri-La	Korean	2017

== A ==
Song	Artist	Lyrics	Music	Album	Language	Year
"After Dark"	VIXX	Ryu Dasom (Jam Factory), Ravi	Andrew Choi, 220, Jake K, Hayley Aitken	Error	Korean	2014
"Amnesia"	VIXX	Strong Dragon, Park Sung-hee, PUFF, SamUIL	Strong Dragon, PUFF, SamUIL	Continuum	Korean	2023

== B ==
Song	Artist	Lyrics	Music	Album	Language	Year
"Bad Bye" (손의 이별)	VIXX	Kim Ji-hyang, Ravi	MELODESIGN, Keeproots, Fascinating	Zelos	Korean	2016
"Beautiful Killer"	VIXX	Lee Yu-jin, Ravi	Albi Albertsson, Chris Wahle	Voodoo	Korean	2013
"Beautiful Liar"	VIXX LR	Ravi, Kim Ji-hyang, Rhymer	Ravi, MELODESIGN	Beautiful Liar	Korean	2015
"Beautiful Night" (아름다운 밤에)	VIXX LR	Leo, Ravi	Leo, AVGS	Whisper	Korean	2017
"B.O.D.Y"	VIXX	Kim Mi-jin	Albi Albertsson, Andreas Carlsson, Andreas Oberg, Stephan Elfgren	Voodoo	Korean	2013
"Black Out"	VIXX	Kim Ji-hyang, Ravi	Simon Janlöv, MELODESIGN	Shangri-La	Korean	2017
"But Not For Me"	VIXX	Yuuko Ando, Ravi, SHOW for Digz, Inc. Group	Yokoyama Yuji	Reincarnation	Japanese	2018
"Butterfly Effect" (나비 효과)	VIXX	Hwang Ji-won (Jam Factory), Ravi	Erik Lidbom, Andreas Oberg	Hades	Korean	2016

== C ==
Song	Artist	Lyrics	Music	Album	Language	Year
"Cactus" (サボテン)	VIXX	N, Japanese: SHOW for Digz, Inc. Group	N, TM	Lalala ~ Thank you for your love ~ (ラララ ～愛をありがとう～)	Japanese	2017
"Can’t Say"	VIXX	Japanese: SHOW for Digz. Inc Group	Japanese: Hwang Se-jun (YellowBIRD), Seo Jung-jin, Kim Doo-hyun	Depend on Me	Japanese	2015
"Can’t Say"	VIXX	Korean: Kim Ji-hyang, Ravi	Korean: Hwang Se-jun (Y.Bird), MELODESIGN	Chained Up	Korean	2015
"Celebration!!"	VIXX	Nakamura Hisakata, Jeff Miyahara	Jeff Miyahara, Erik Lidbom	Lalala ~ Thank you for your love ~ (ラララ ～愛をありがとう～)	Japanese	2017
"CHAOS"	VIXX	Kim Ji-hyang, MELODESIGN, Ravi (rap)	MELODESIGN	Hyde	Korean	2013
"Chained Up" (사슬)	VIXX	Korean: Misfit, Ravi	Albi Albertsson, Hugo Solis, Farah Achour, Carl Arvid Lehne	Chained Up	Korean	2015
"Chained Up" (Chinese version)	VIXX	Chinese: Wang Yajun	Albi Albertsson, Hugo Solis, Farah Achour, Carl Arvid Lehne	Non-album single	Chinese	2015
"Chained Up" (Japanese version)	VIXX	Japanese: SHOW for Digz. Inc Group	Albi Albertsson, Hugo Solis, Farah Achour, Carl Arvid Lehne	Depend on Me	Japanese	2016
"Chemical"	VIXX	HotSauce, collapsedone, J-Hype, Leo, Kang Eun-jeong	HotSauce, collapsedone, J-Hype	Continuum	Korean	2023
"Chocolatier"	VIXX LR	Ravi	Ravi, PUFF, Song Si-yoon	Whisper	Korean	2017
"Circle"	VIXX	Ravi	Ravi, PUFF	Eau De VIXX	Korean	2018
"Crush My Mind"	VIXX	miyakei	youwhich, HIKARI	Lalala ~ Thank you for your love ~ (ラララ ～愛をありがとう～)	Japanese	2017

== D ==
Song	Artist	Lyrics	Music	Album	Language	Year
"Depend on Me"	VIXX	SHOW for Digz, Inc. Group	Erik Lidbom for Hitfire Production	Depend on Me	Japanese	2016
"Desperate"	VIXX	MAFLY, Park Woo-hyun, Ravi	Erik Lidbom, MELODESIGN	Kratos	Korean	2016
"Destiny Love" (命中注定)	VIXX	—		Boys' Record	Chinese	2015
"Don't Want to Be an Idol" (아이돌 하기 싫어)	VIXX	Min Yeon Jae	Drew Ryan Scott, Alex Niceforo	On and On	Korean	2013
"Dynamite" (다이너마이트)	VIXX	Misfit, Ravi	Simon Janlöv, Andrew Choi, MELODESIGN	Zelos	Korean	2016

== E ==
Song	Artist	Lyrics	Music	Album	Language	Year
"ECHO"	VIXX	Korean: Kim Ji-hyang, Ravi	MELODESIGN, Keeproots, fascinating	Depend on Me	Japanese	2016
"ECHO"	VIXX	Japanese: SHOW for Digz. Inc Group	MELODESIGN, Keeproots, fascinating	Depend on Me	Japanese	2016
"Error"	VIXX	Korean: Kim Eana	Hwang Se-jun, MELODESIGN	Error	Korean	2014
"Error" (Japanese version)	VIXX	Japanese: SHOW for Digz. Inc Group	Hwang Se-jun, MELODESIGN	Depend on Me	Japanese	2014
"Error" (Chinese version)	VIXX	—	Hwang Se-jun, MELODESIGN	Non-album single	Chinese	2015
"Escape"	VIXX	Ravi	Ravi, Yuth	Eau De VIXX	Korean	2018
"Eternity" (기적)	VIXX	Kim Eana	Hyuk Shin, Deanfluenza, 2xxx!, DK, siyeonking!	Eternity	Korean	2014

== F ==
Song	Artist	Lyrics	Music	Album	Language	Year
"Fantasy"	VIXX	Kim Mi-jin (Music Cube), Ravi	Devine Channel	Hades	Korean	2016
"Feeling"	VIXX LR	Leo, Ravi	Leo, AVGS	Whisper	Korean	2017

== G ==
Song	Artist	Lyrics	Music	Album	Language	Year
"G.R.8.U" (대.다.나.다.너)	VIXX	Kim Eana	Hyuk Shin, DK, Ross Lara, Todd Wright	Jekyll	Korean	2013
"Ghost"	Ravi	Ravi		Beautiful Liar	Korean	2015
"Good Day"	VIXX	Hyuk, Ravi	Hyuk, freckle face	Eau De VIXX	Korean	2018
"Good Night & Good Morning"	VIXX	Ravi		Kratos	Korean	2016
"Goodbye your love"	VIXX	SHOW for Digz, Inc. Group	Gravity, Song Youngmin, Lee Changkeun	Depend on Me	Japanese	2016

== H ==
Song	Artist	Lyrics	Music	Album	Language	Year
"Hana-Kaze" (花風)	VIXX	harumi	Hisashi Nawata (ARTIMAGE INC.)	Hana-Kaze (花風)	Japanese	2016
"How ‘bout you"	VIXX	Ravi, SHOW for Digz, Inc.	Ravi, PUFF	Lalala ~ Thank you for your love ~ (ラララ ～愛をありがとう～)	Japanese	2017
"Heaven"	VIXX	Ravi		Chained Up	Korean	2015
"Hot Enough"	VIXX	Kim Min-jin, Ravi	Erik Lidbom, MLC, Deeepsol, Odd.I	Chained Up	Korean	2015
"Hyde"	VIXX	Kim Eana, Ravi (rap)	Hwang Se-jun, D30	Hyde	Korean	2013

== I ==
Song	Artist	Lyrics	Music	Album	Language	Year
"If You Come Tonight"	VIXX	Ryan IM, EJO IM, Leo, Katchy, Uknow	Ryan IM, EJO IM, Katchy, Uknow	Continuum	Korean	2023
"Into the Void"	VIXX	Kim Soo-jung (Music Cube), 77어린이 (Music Cube), Ravi	Erik Lidbom, MLC	Shangri-La	Korean	2017

== J ==
Song	Artist	Lyrics	Music	Album	Language	Year
"Jekyll"	VIXX	None	MELODESIGN	Jekyll	Korean	2013

== L ==
Song	Artist	Lyrics	Music	Album	Language	Year
"Lalala ~ Thank you for your love ~" (ラララ ～愛をありがとう～)	VIXX	MORISHIN	MORISHIN, REO	Lalala ~ Thank you for your love ~ (ラララ ～愛をありがとう～)	Japanese	2017
"Last Note～消えた後の蝋燭の香り"	VIXX	Atsushi Yanaka, Ravi, SHOW for Digz, Inc. Group	Keiichi Tomita	Reincarnation	Japanese	2018
"Light Up the Darkness" (어둠 속을 밝혀줘)	VIXX	Ravi	Hyuk Shin, DK, Ross Lara	Jekyll	Korean	2013
"Lilac" (라이락)	VIXX	Hyuk, Joosuc, Do-yeon (wavecloud), Lee-gyeong (wavecloud), Owl (VENDORS), Abim (VENDORS), Louis (VENDORS), Fascinador (VENDORS)	Hyuk, Owl (VENDORS), Abim (VENDORS), Louis (VENDORS), Fascinador (VENDORS)	Continuum	Korean	2023
"Love Come True" (오늘부터 내 여자)	VIXX	Kim Ji-hyang, Ravi	MELODESIGN	Voodoo	Korean	2013
"Love Equation" (이별공식)	VIXX	Yoon Sung-hee, Ravi	Hong Jae-Seon	Boys' Record	Korean	2015
"Love Letter"	VIXX	Kim Ji-hyang, MELODESIGN	Hwang Se-jun, MELODESIGN	Hyde	Korean	2013
"Love Letter" (Japanese version)	VIXX	Japanese: SHOW for Digz. Inc Group	Hwang Se-jun, MELODESIGN	Depend on Me	Japanese	2016
"Love, LaLaLa"	VIXX	Kim Ji-hyang, MELODESIGN, Ravi	MELODESIGN, Keeproots, fascinating	Eternity	Korean	2014
"Love Me Do"	VIXX	Kim Changrock, Andrew Baag, Han Kyoung-soo, Ravi	Kim Changrock, Andrew Baag	Hades	Korean	2016

== M ==
Song	Artist	Lyrics	Music	Album	Language	Year
"Maze"	VIXX	Misfit, Ravi	Albi Albertsson, Martin Mulholland, Nalle Ahlesdt	Chained Up	Korean	2015
"Memory"	VIXX	Ravi		Boys' Record	Korean	2015
"Milky Way"	VIXX	Ravi, Hyuk	Justin Reinstein	VIXX 2016 Conception Ker	Korean	2016
"Mistress"	VIXX	None	MELODESIGN	Chained Up	Korean	2015
"Moonlight"	VIXX	Leo		Hana-Kaze (花風)	Japanese	2016
"Mukae ni ikou" (迎えに行こう)	VIXX	SHOW for Digz, Inc. Group	Seo Jungjin, Kim Doohyun, Cho Yongho	Can’t Say	Japanese	2015
"My Light"	VIXX	Leo, Ravi	Leo, MELODESIGN	Beautiful Liar	Korean	2015
"My Valentine"	VIXX	Kim Ji-hyang, Ravi	Park Won-woo, Matt Wong	Eau De VIXX	Korean	2018

== N ==
Song	Artist	Lyrics	Music	Album	Language	Year
"Navy & Shining Gold"	VIXX	Ravi	KEN, Ravi, Hyuk, IVeR	Eau De VIXX	Korean	2018

== O ==
Song	Artist	Lyrics	Music	Album	Language	Year
"Odd Sense"	VIXX	Cho Yun-kyung, Ravi	Albi Albertsson, Jay & Rudy	Eau De VIXX	Korean	2018
"On a Cold Night" (차가운 밤에)	VIXX	Leo, Ravi (rap)	Leo	Boys' Record	Korean	2015
"On and On" (다칠 준비가 돼 있어)	VIXX	Kim Eana, Ravi (rap)	Hwang Se-jun, Albi Albertsson, Ricky Hanley, Kirstine Lind	On and On	Korean	2013
"Only U" (대답은 너니까)	VIXX	Kim Ji-hyang, Ravi	Hwang Se-jun, 4번타자, Shinsadong Tiger	Voodoo	Korean	2013
"Out of Sorts" (부시시)	VIXX	Kim Ji-hyang, Ravi	MELODESIGN	Chained Up	Korean	2015

== P ==
Song	Artist	Lyrics	Music	Album	Language	Year
"Poison" (독)	VIXX LR	Leo, Ravi	B-rock (Headline), Jade key (Headline), J-lin (Headline), Leo, Ravi	Complete LR	Korean	2018

== R ==
Song	Artist	Lyrics	Music	Album	Language	Year
"Reincarnation"	VIXX	SHOW for Digz, Inc. Group	Simon Janlov, MLC	Reincarnation	Japanese	2018
"Remember"	VIXX LR	Ravi		Beautiful Liar	Korean	2015
"Resemble" (닮아)	VIXX	N, Ravi	N, TM, Midnight	Eau De VIXX	Korean	2018
"Rock Ur Body"	VIXX	Choi Kyu-sung, Swings	Shinsadong Tiger, Choi Kyu-sung	Rock Ur Body	Korean	2012
"Romance is Over" (로맨스는 끝났다)	VIXX	Leo, Ravi	Leo	Kratos	Korean	2016

== S ==
Song	Artist	Lyrics	Music	Album	Language	Year
"Sad Ending"	VIXX	Lee Seu Lan (Jam Factory), Ravi	Erik Lidbom, Jon Hallgren	Eternity	Korean	2014
"Savage"	VIXX	Na Yun-jeong, arcon, Hui Chang (Coke Paris), Jimmy Claeson	arcon, Hui Chang (Coke Paris), Jimmy Claeson	Continuum	Korean	2023
"Say Love" (어떡하지)	VIXX	Ravi, AIS	Michael McGarity, Theresa Houston	Jekyll	Korean	2013
"Say U, Say Me"	VIXX	Ravi, Kiggen	Hyuk Shin, DK, Ross Lara	Voodoo	Korean	2013
"Scentist" (향)	VIXX	Kim Mi-jin, Ravi	Jake K (Full8loom), Andreas Oberg, Drew Ryan Scott, Nick Kaelar	Eau De VIXX	Korean	2018
"Secret Night"	VIXX	Ravi		Voodoo	Korean	2013
"Shadow"	VIXX	Leo		Depend on Me	Japanese	2016
"Shangri-La" (도원경/桃源境)	VIXX	Jung Il-ri, Ravi	Devine Channel	Shangri-La	Korean	2017
"Shooting Star"	VIXX	MAFLY, KEYFLY, Ravi	Simon Janlöv, MLC, Cho Yong-ho	Kratos	Korean	2016
"Silence"	VIXX	Ravi	Ravi, Jeff Lewis, Joombas, Sun (Joombas)	Eau De VIXX	Korean	2018
"Six Feet Under" (늪)	VIXX	Kim Sujeong, Ravi	Harry Brooks, Dan Goudie, Ash Milton	Zelos	Korean	2016
"Someday"	VIXX	Kim Ji-hyang, Ravi, MELODESIGN	MELODESIGN, Keeproots, Fascinating	Voodoo	Korean	2013
"Spider"	VIXX	Park Sung-hee (Jam Factory), Ravi	Simon Janlöv	Chained Up	Korean	2015
"Starlight"	VIXX	Jeong Hye Young, Ravi (rap)	Andreas Oberg, Erik Lidbom, Jona Nilsson	Super Hero	Korean	2012
"Steel Heart"	VIXX	None	MELODESIGN, Lee Seul-gi	Error	Korean	2014
"Stop it Girl"	VIXX	Kim Ji-hyang, Ravi	Erik Lidbom, Andreas Oberg	Chained Up	Korean	2015
"Sugar"	VIXX	SHOW for Digz, Inc. Group, Ravi	Shingo Suzuki	Reincarnation	Japanese	2018
"Super Hero"	VIXX	Kiggen, Ravi (rap)	Kiggen, Brent Paschke, Jimmy Richard Drew	Super Hero	Korean	2012

== T ==
Song	Artist	Lyrics	Music	Album	Language	Year
"Thank You for Being Born" (태어나줘서 고마워)	VIXX	Kim Ji-hyang, MELODESIGN	MELODESIGN	Voodoo	Korean	2013
"The Closer"	VIXX	Kim Mi-jin (Music Cube), Ravi	Devine Channel	Kratos	Korean	2016
"The Rain"	VIXX	Lee Joohyung (Mono Tree), Hyuk, Ravi, SHOW for Digz, Inc. Group	Hyuk, Lee Joohyung (Mono Tree)	Reincarnation	Japanese	2018
"Time Machine"	VIXX	1월 8일 (Jam Factory), Ravi	Albi Albertsson	Error	Korean	2014
"To Us" (우리에게)	VIXX	Kim Ji-hyang, Ravi	MELODESIGN, Keeproots, fascinating	Shangri-La	Korean	2017
"Today"	VIXX LR	Ravi	Ravi, PUFF	Whisper	Korean	2017
"Trigger"	VIXX	Kim Mi-jin, Ravi	Hyuk, Royal Dive, Jeff Lewis	Eau De VIXX	Korean	2018

== U ==
Song	Artist	Lyrics	Music	Album	Language	Year
"UUUUU" (아픈데 좋아)	VIXX	Kim Ji-hyang, Ravi	Kim Du-heon	Rock Ur Body	Korean	2012
"Us Now" (지금 우린)	VIXX	Kim Ji-hyang	MELODESIGN	Chained Up	Korean	2015

== V ==
Song	Artist	Lyrics	Music	Album	Language	Year
"Voodoo"	VIXX	None	MELODESIGN	Voodoo	Korean	2013
"Voodoo Doll" (저주인형)	VIXX	Kim Eana	Hyuk Shin, Deanfluenza, 2xxx!, RE:ONE, Lee Jae-Hoon	Voodoo	Korean	2013

== W ==
Song	Artist	Lyrics	Music	Album	Language	Year
"Walking"	VIXX	N, Ravi	N	Single	Korean	2019
"What U Waiting For"	VIXX	Ravi		Error	Korean	2014
"Whisper"	VIXX LR	Ravi	Ravi, Yuth	Whisper	Korean	2017
"Whisper" _{(Japanese version)}	VIXX LR	Ravi, Japanese: SHOW for Digz, Inc. Group	Ravi, Yuth	Complete LR	Japanese	2018
"With Me"	VIXX	Ravi		Depend on Me	Japanese	2016
"Words To Say" (할 말)	Leo	Leo		Beautiful Liar	Korean	2015

== Y ==
Song	Artist	Lyrics	Music	Album	Language	Year
"You're Mine" (그만 버티고)	VIXX (ft. Minah)	Kim Ji-hyang, Ravi (rap)	Park Gyunghyun, MELODESIGN	Jekyll / Hyde	Korean	2013
"Youth Hurts" (청춘이 아파)	VIXX	Korean: Ravi, Kim Ji-hyang	MELODESIGN	Error	Korean	2014
"Youth Hurts" (青春だって)	VIXX	Japanese: SHOW for Digz, Inc. Group	MELODESIGN	Error	Japanese	2014

== Other songs ==
Song	Artist	Lyrics	Music	Album	Language	Year
"Because It's Christmas" (크리스마스니까)	VIXX, Sung Si-kyung, Park Hyo-shin, Seo In Guk, Lee Seok-hoon	Seo Jung-jin, Kim Duhyeon		Jelly Christmas 2012 Heart Project	Korean	2012
"Girls, Why?" (여자는 왜)	VIXX and OKDAL	Kim Yoon-ju, Ravi (rap)	Kim Yoon-ju	Y.BIRD from Jellyfish Island With VIXX & OKDAL	Korean	2013
"I'm a Boy, You're a Girl"	VIXX and OKDAL	Kim Yoon-ju, Park Sae-jin, Ravi (rap)	Kim Yoon-ju, Park Sae-jin	Y.BIRD from Jellyfish Island With VIXX & OKDAL	Korean	2013
"Winter Confession" (겨울고백)	VIXX, Sung Si-kyung, Park Hyo-shin, Seo In Guk, Little Sister	Kim Ji-hyang, Ravi (rap)	MELODESIGN	겨울 고백 (Jelly Christmas 2013)	Korean	2013
"Turn Around and Look at Me" (나를 돌아봐)	VIXX	Lee Hyun		DEUX 20th Anniversary Tribute Album Part.7	Korean	2014
"Love In The Air" (사랑난로)	VIXX, Seo In-guk, Park Jung-ah, Park Yoon-ha	Kim Ji-hyang, Ravi (rap)	MELODESIGN	Jelly Christmas 2015 – 4랑	Korean	2015
"Falling" (니가 내려와)	VIXX, Seo In-guk, Gugudan, Park Yoon-ha, Park Jung-ah, Kim Gyu-sun, Kim Ye-won, Jiyul	Kim Ji-hyang, Ravi	MELODESIGN	Jelly Christmas 2016	Korean	2016
"Alive"	VIXX	주찬양	Command Freaks, 주찬양, Secret Weapon	Moorim School OST Part. 1	Korean	2016
"The King"	VIXX	똘아이박, 피터팬	똘아이박, 피터팬, 미친기집애	Moorim School OST Part. 2	Korean	2016
"Take Your Hand"	VIXX	Seo Jun Park, Seo Young Lim, Ravi	Park Se-Jun, Woo Ji Hoon	Man to Man OST Part. 1	Korean	2017

== See also ==
- VIXX discography
- List of awards and nominations received by VIXX
- List of songs written by Ravi
