= List of songs written by Ravi =

Ravi is a South Korean rapper, songwriter and producer, signed under Jellyfish Entertainment. He began his career as a rapper in 2012 in the South Korean boy group VIXX, and later formed VIXX's first sub-unit VIXX LR with bandmate Leo in 2015. Ravi's songwriting career began with his participation in co-writing VIXX's debut single "Super Hero". As of October 2026, Ravi has 242 writing, composition, and arrangement registered in KOMCA. Ravi is widely known for his participation of composing and songwriting rap portions for the group as well as lyrics and music.

== VIXX albums ==
All song credits are adapted from the Korea Music Copyright Association's database unless stated otherwise.

Year	Album	Song	Lyrics		Composition		Arrangement		Notes
Year	Album	Song	Credited	With	Credited	With	Credited	With	Notes
2012	Rock Ur Body	"UUUUU"	Yes	Kim Ji-hyang	No	Kim Doo-hyun	No	Kim Doo-hyun	
2013	Hyde	"Chaos"	Yes	Seo Jung-jin, Kim Doo-hyun, Kim Ji-hyang	No	Seo Jung-jin, Kim Doo-hyun	—N/a	—N/a	
2013	Hyde	"Light Up The Darkness"	Yes	Shin Hyuk, Dishawn Towns	No	Hyeong Kyu-kim, Shin Hyuk, Lara Ross	—N/a	—N/a	
2013	Hyde	"You're Mine"	Yes	Kim Ji-hyang	No	Seo Jung-jin, Kim Doo-hyun, Pak Kyung-hyun	—N/a	—N/a	
2013	Jekyll	"What to Do"	Yes	AIS	No	Marie Houston, Michael Mcgarity	—N/a	—N/a	
2013	Voodoo	"Beautiful Killer"	Yes	Lee Yujin, Albi, Albertsson, Chris Wahle	No	Albi Albertsson, Chris Wahle	—N/a	—N/a	
2013	Voodoo	"Love Come True"	Yes	Kim Ji-hyang	No	Melodesign	No	Melodesign	
2013	Voodoo	"Only U (대답은 너니까)"	Yes	Kim Ji-hyang	No	Kang Jun-seok, Kim Ha-nell, Hang Se-joon, Shinsadong Tiger	No	Kang Jun-seok, Kim Ha-nell, Shinsadong Tiger	
2013	Voodoo	"Say U Say Me"	Yes	Kiggen, J Evans	No	Kim Hyeong-kyu, Shin Hyuk, Ross Lara, Michael Furlong	—N/a	—N/a	
2013	Voodoo	"Secret Night"	Yes	—N/a	Yes	—N/a	No	Seo Jae-woo	RAVI's solo song as a part of VIXX
2013	Voodoo	"Someday"	Yes	Seo Jung-jin, Kim Doo-hyun, Kim Ji-hyang	No	Seo Jung-jin, Kim Do-hyun, Fascinating, Keeproots	No	Melodesign, Fascinating, Keeproots	
2014	ERROR	"After Dark"	Yes	Ryu Dasom	No	Kim Byung-jin, Choi Sung-hyun, 220, Michelle Aitken	—N/a	—N/a	
2014	ERROR	"Blue Blossom"	Yes	Kim Ji-hyang	No	Melodesign	No	Melodesign	
2014	ERROR	"Error"	Yes	Kim Eana	No	Hwang Se-joon, Melodesign	No	Seo Jae-woo	
2014	ERROR	"Time Machine"	Yes	Jam Factory, Albi Albertsson	No	Albi Albertsson	—N/a	—N/a	
2014	ERROR	"What U Waiting For"	Yes	—N/a	Yes	—N/a	No	Son Young-jin, Seo Jae-woo	
2014	Eternity	"Love Lalala"	Yes	Seo Jung-jin, Kim Doo-hyun, Kim Ji-hyang	No	Seo Jung-jin, Kim Doo-hyun, Fascinating, Keeproots	—N/a	—N/a	
2014	Eternity	"Sad Ending"	Yes	Lee Seu-ran, Henning Hallgren, Gustaf Lidbom	No	Henning Hallgren, Gustaf Lidbom	—N/a	—N/a	
2015	Boys' Record	"Love Equation"	Yes	Yoon Sung-hee	No	Hong jae-seon	No	Cho Yong-ho, Melodesign	
2015	Boys' Record	"Memory"	Yes	—N/a	Yes	—N/a	No	Lee Seul-ki, Melodesign	
2015	Boys' Record	"On A Cold Night"	Yes	Leo	No	Leo	No	Melodesign	
2015	Chained Up	"Can't Say"	Yes	Kim Ji-hyang	No	Hwang Se-joon, Melodesign	No	Melodesign	
2015	Chained Up	"Chained Up"	Yes	Misfit, Albi Albertsson, Hugo Solis, Farah Achour, Carl Lehne	No	Albi Albertsson, Hugo Solis, Farah Achour, Carl Lehne	—N/a	—N/a	
2015	Chained Up	"Heaven"	Yes	—N/a	Yes	—N/a	Yes	Cho Yong-ho	
2015	Chained Up	"Hot Enough"	Yes	Joung Gene, KIm Mi-jin, Gustaf Lidbom, Michael Cheung, Deeepsol	No	Joung Gene, Gustaf Lidbom, Michael Cheung, Deeepsol	—N/a	—N/a	
2015	Chained Up	"Maze"	Yes	Misfit, Martin Mulholland, Albi Albertsson, Nalle Ahlstedt	No	Martin Mulholland, Albi Albertsson, Nalle Ahlstedt	—N/a	—N/a	
2015	Chained Up	"Out of Sorts (부시시)"	Yes	Kim Ji-hyang	No	Melodesign	No	Melodesign	
2015	Chained Up	"Spider"	Yes	Park Seonghee, Janlov Simon	No	Janlov Simon	—N/a	—N/a	
2015	Chained Up	"Stop It Girl"	Yes	Kim Ji-hyang, Erik Oberg, Gustaf Lidbom	No	Erik Oberg, Gustaf Lidbom	—N/a	—N/a	
2016	Depend On Me	"Goodbye Your Love"	Yes	Show	No	Gravity, Song Young-min, Lee Chang-geun	No	Gravity	
2016	Depend On Me	"Shadow"	Yes	Leo	No	Cho Yong-ho, Leo	—N/a	—N/a	
2016	Fantasy	"Fantasy"	Yes	Kim Mi-jin	No	Chase, Lim Kwang-wook, Ryan Kim, Sam Stone	—N/a	—N/a	
2016	Hades	"Butterfly Effect"	Yes	Jee Won-hwang, Gustaf Lidbom, Erik Oberg	No	Gustaf Lidbom, Erik Oberg	—N/a	—N/a	
2016	Hades	"Love Me Do"	Yes	Han Kyung-su, Kim Chang-rock, Bang Yong-kuk	No	Kim Chang-rock, Bang Yong-kuk	No	Devil Cat, Kim Chang-rock, Bang Yong-kuk	
2016	Hanakaze	"Moonlight"	Yes	Leo	No	Cho Yong-ho, Leo	—N/a	—N/a	
2016	VIXX 2016 Conception Ker	"Milky Way"	Yes	Han Sang-hyuk, Robert Reinstein	No	Rober Reinstein	—N/a	—N/a	
2016	Kratos	"Desperate"	Yes	Mafly1, Wu Hyun-Park, Gustaf Lidbom	No	Melodesign, Gustaf Lidbom	—N/a	—N/a	
2016	Kratos	"Good Night & Good Morning"	Yes	—N/a	Yes	—N/a	No	Kiggen	
2016	Kratos	"Shooting Star"	Yes	Keyfly, Karl Janloev, Michael Cheung	No	Cho Yong-ho, Karl Janloev, Michael Cheung	—N/a	—N/a	
2016	Kratos	"The Closer"	Yes	Kim Mi-jin	No	Doppio, Chase, Lim Kwang-wook, Ryan Kim, Anthony Lee, Sam Stone	—N/a	—N/a	
2016	Kratos	"The Romance Is Over"	Yes	Leo	No	Cho Yong-ho, Leo	No	Cho Yong-ho	
2016	Zelos	"Badbye"	Yes	Kim Ji-hyang	No	Melodesign, Fascinating, Keeproots	—N/a	—N/a	
2016	Zelos	"Dynamite"	Yes	Misfit, Andrew Choi, Simon Janlov	No	Seo Jung-jin, Kim Doo-hyun, Andrew Choi, Simon Janlov	—N/a	—N/a	
2016	Zelos	"Six Feet Under"	Yes	Kim Soo-jeong, Brooks Harry, Denis Goudie, Peter Milton	No	Brooks Harry, Denis Goudie, Peter Milton	—N/a	—N/a	
2017	Lalala ~ Thank you for your love ~ (ラララ ～愛をありがとう～)	"How 'bout You"	Yes	—N/a	Yes	Cho Yong-ho	Yes	Cho Yong-ho	
2017	Shangri-La	"Black Out"	Yes	Melodesign, Kim Ji-hyang, Karl Janloev	No	Melodesign, Karl Janloev	—N/a	—N/a	
2017	Shangri-La	"Into The Void"	Yes	77eo Rin I, Kim Soo-jeong, Gustaf Lidbom, Michael Cheung	No	Gustaf Lidbom, Michael Cheung	—N/a	—N/a	
2017	Shangri-La	"Shangri-La"	Yes	Jungilli	No	Chase, Lim Kwang-wook, Ryan Kim, Sam Stone	—N/a	—N/a	
2017	Shangri-La	"To Us"	Yes	Kim Ji-hyang	No	Melodesign, Fascinating, Keeproots	No	Melodesign, Fascinating, Keeproots	
2017	Shangri-La	"다가오네 (1, 2, 3, 4, 5)"	Yes	—N/a	Yes	Cho Yong-ho	Yes	Cho Yong-ho	
2017	VIXX Live Fantasia	"Hong Gil Dong"	Yes	—N/a	Yes	Yoo Sun-kyun	Yes	Yoo Sun-kyun	RAVI's solo song as a part of VIXX. Also released under RAVI's 2018 mixtape re-released "R.EBIRTH"
2017	VIXX Live Fantasia	"So Romantic"	Yes	—N/a	Yes	Cho Yong-ho	Yes	Cho Yong-ho	Solo song performed by Ken of VIXX
2018	Eau De VIXX	"Circle"	Yes	—N/a	Yes	Cho Yong-ho	Yes	Cho Yong-ho	
2018	Eau De VIXX	"Escape"	Yes	—N/a	Yes	Yuth	Yes	Yuth	
2018	Eau De VIXX	"Good Day"	Yes	Han Sang-hyuk	No	Choi Sung-min, Han Sang-hyuk	No	Choi Sung-min, WLKY	
2018	Eau De VIXX	"My Valentine"	Yes	Kim Ji-hyang	No	Park Gun-woo, Lawrence Wong	—N/a	—N/a	
2018	Eau De VIXX	"Navy & Shining Gold"	Yes	—N/a	Yes	Iver, Han Sang-hyuk, Lee Jae-hwan	No	Iver	
2018	Eau De VIXX	"Odd Sense"	Yes	Cho Yun-kyoung, Albi Albertsson, Rudi Daouk, Jakob Mihoubi	No	Albi Albertsson, Rui Daouk, Jakob Mihoubi	—N/a	—N/a	
2018	Eau De VIXX	"Scentist"	Yes	Kim Mi-jin	No	Kim Jin, Erik Ober, Andrew Richard, Karl Pittsinger	—N/a	—N/a	
2018	Eau De VIXX	"Silence"	Yes	—N/a	Yes	Kwon Taeyang, Minsu Bae, Jeff Lewis	—N/a	—N/a	
2018	Eau De VIXX	"Trigger"	Yes	Kim Mi-jin	No	Royal Dive, Han Sang-hyuk, Jeff Lewis	—N/a	—N/a	
2018	Eau De VIXX	"닮아 (Resemble)"	Yes	Cha Hak-yeon	No	TM, Cha Hak-yeon, Midnight	No	TM, Midnight	
2019	Parallel	"Parallel"	Yes	Park Seong-hee, Jungilli	No	Gustaf Lidbom, Erik Oberg	—N/a	—N/a	
2019	Walking	"Walking"	Yes	Cha Hak-yeon	No	TM, Cha Hak-yeon, Midnight	No	TM, Midnight	

== VIXX LR albums ==
All song credits are adapted from the Korea Music Copyright Association's database unless stated otherwise.

Year	Album	Song	Lyrics		Composition		Arrangement		Notes
Year	Album	Song	Credited	With	Credited	With	Credited	With	Notes
2015	Beautiful Liar	"Beautiful Liar"	Yes	Rhymer, Kim Ji-hyang	Yes	Melodesign	No	Cho Yong-ho, ASSBRASS	
2015	Beautiful Liar	"Ghost"	Yes	—N/a	Yes	—N/a	Yes	Cho Yong-ho	
2015	Beautiful Liar	"My Light"	Yes	Leo	No	Leo, Melodesign	No	Melodesign	
2015	Beautiful Liar	"Remember"	Yes	—N/a	Yes	—N/a	No	Kiggen	
2017	Whisper	"Chocolatier"	Yes	—N/a	Yes	Cho Yong-ho, Song Si-yun	Yes	Cho Yong-ho, Song Si-yun	
2017	Whisper	"Feeling"	Yes	Leo	No	Leo, Lim Shae-sung, Hyun Jae-wook	No	Lim Shae-sung, Hyun Jae-wook	
2017	Whisper	"Today"	Yes	—N/a	Yes	Cho Yong-ho	Yes	Cho Yong-ho	
2017	Whisper	"Whisper"	Yes	—N/a	Yes	Yuth	Yes	Yuth	
2017	Whisper	"Beautiful Night"	Yes	Leo	No	Leo, Lim Shae-sung, Hyun Jae-wook	No	Lim Shae-sung, Hyun Jae-wook	
2017	VIXX LR 1st Concert [ECLIPSE] in Seoul	"Poison" (독)	Yes	Leo	Yes	B-rock, Leo, Jade Key, J-Lin	No	B-rock, Jade Key, J-Lin	
2017	VIXX LR 1st Concert [ECLIPSE] in Seoul	"Words To Say"	Yes	Leo	No	Cho Yong-ho, Leo	No	Cho Yong-ho, Leo	

== VIXX other releases ==
All song credits are adapted from the Korea Music Copyright Association's database unless stated otherwise.

Year	Album	Song	Artist	Lyrics		Composition		Arrangement		Notes
Year	Album	Song	Artist	Credited	With	Credited	With	Credited	With	Notes
2013	Jelly Christmas 2013	"Winter Confession"	VIXX, Sung Si-kyung, Park Hyo-shin, Seo In-guk, and Little Sister (Yeo Dong-saeng	Yes	Seo Jung-jin, Kim Doo-hyun, Kim Ji-hyang	No	Seo Jung-jin, Kim Do-hyun	No	Seo Jung-jin, Kim Doo-hyun	
2013	KBS Super Junior's Kiss the Radio	"Sukira Song"	VIXX	Yes	—N/a	Yes	—N/a	—N/a	—N/a	
2013	Y.BIRD from Jellyfish Island with VIXX & OKDAL	"Girls, Why?"	VIXX	Yes	Kim Yoon-ju	No	Kim Yoon-ju	No	Seo Jung-jin, Kim Doo-hyun	
2013	Y.BIRD from Jellyfish Island with VIXX & OKDAL	"I'm a Boy, You're a Girl (Feat. OKDAL)"	VIXX	Yes	Kim Yoon-ju, Park Se-jin	No	Kim Yoon-ju, Park Se-jin	No	Nikel	
2014	DEUX 20th Anniversary Tribute Album Part. 7	"Turn Around and Look at Me"	VIXX	Yes	Lee Hyun-do	No	Lee Hyun-do	No	Radio Galaxi, Double Kick	
2015	Jelly Christmas 2015 - 4rang	"Love In The Air"	VIXX, Seo In-guk, Park Jung-ah, Park Yoon-ha	Yes	Kim Ji-hyang	No	Seo Jung-jin, Kim Doo-hyun	No	Seo Jung-jin, Kim Doo-hyun	
2016	Jelly Box Jelly Christmas 2016	"Falling"	VIXX, Seo In-guk, gugudan, Park Yoon-ha, Park Jung-ah, Kim Gyu-sun, Kim Ye-won, Jiyul	Yes	Kim Ji-hyang	No	Melodesign	No	Melodesign	
2017	Man To Man OST Part 1	"Take Your Hand"	VIXX	Yes	Lim Seo-young, Park Sei-joon	No	Park Sei-joon, Woo Ji-hoon	No	Park Sei-joon, Woo Ji-hoon	
2018	Are You Human Too? OST Part.1	"Is It Love?"	VIXX	Yes	Choi Ha-na, 17Holic	No	Seo Gong-ryong	No	Lim Dae-hyun, Seo Gong-ryong	

== Solo albums & releases ==
All song credits are adapted from the Korea Music Copyright Association's database unless stated otherwise.

Year	Album	Song	Lyrics		Composition		Arrangement		Notes
Year	Album	Song	Credited	With	Credited	With	Credited	With	Notes
2016	DamnRa	"DamnRa (Feat. SAM&SP3CK)"	Yes	—N/a	Yes	SAM&SP3CK	Yes	SAM&SP3CK	Part of Jellyfish Entertainment's music channel project, Jelly Box
2016	R.EBIRTH	"Control (Interlude)"	—N/a	—N/a	Yes	—N/a	Yes	—N/a	
2016	R.EBIRTH	"Lean On Me"	Yes	—N/a	Yes	Cho Yong-ho	Yes	Cho Yong-ho	
2016	R.EBIRTH	"Move"	Yes	—N/a	Yes	—N/a	Yes	—N/a	
2016	R.EBIRTH	"OX (Feat. Basick)"	Yes	Basick	Yes	—N/a	Yes	—N/a	
2016	R.EBIRTH	"R.EBIRTH"	Yes	—N/a	Yes	—N/a	Yes	—N/a	
2016	R.EBIRTH	"Where Should I Go (Feat. Microdot)"	Yes	Microdot	Yes	—N/a	Yes	—N/a	
2016	R.EBIRTH	"Where Should I Go (Solo Ver.)"	Yes	—N/a	Yes	—N/a	Yes	—N/a	
2016	R.EBIRTH	"Nod Nod"	Yes	Song Yang-won	Yes	—N/a	Yes	—N/a	
2016	R.EBIRTH	"Möbius Strip (Feat. ESBEE)"	Yes	—N/a	Yes	Cho Yong-ho	Yes	Cho Yong-ho	
2016	R.EBIRTH	"Do The Dance"	Yes	—N/a	Yes	SAM&SP3CK	Yes	SAM&SP3CK	
2016	R.EBIRTH	"Good Woman (Feat. Hanhae & Soulman)"	Yes	Hanhae	Yes	Cho Yong-ho	Yes	Ji Seok-yong, Cho Yong-ho	
2017	R.EAL1ZE	"Home Alone (Feat. Jung Yong-hwa of CNBLUE)"	Yes	—N/a	Yes	Melodesign	—N/a	—N/a	
2017	R.EAL1ZE	"BOMB (Feat. San E)"	Yes	San E	Yes	Cho Yong-ho	—N/a	—N/a	
2017	R.EAL1ZE	"Ladi Dadi (Feat. Microdot, Jero)"	Yes	Microdot	Yes	Cho Yong-ho	—N/a	—N/a	
2017	R.EAL1ZE	"Rose (Feat. Ken of VIXX)"	Yes	—N/a	Yes	Assbrass	Yes	Assbrass	
2018	R.EBIRTH	"Lucid Dream (Feat. Microdot)"	Yes	Microdot	Yes	Cho Yong-ho	Yes	Cho Yong-ho	New songs added to re-release of 2016 album "R.EBIRTH"
2018	R.EBIRTH	"Who Are U (Feat. Superbee)"	Yes	Superbee	Yes	—N/a	Yes	—N/a	New songs added to re-release of 2016 album "R.EBIRTH"
2018	ADORABLE	"ADORABLE (featuring Yang Yoseop of Highlight) "	Yes	—N/a	Yes	Cho Yong-ho	Yes	Cho Yong-ho	
2018	K1TCHEN	"Shot (Bonus Track)"	Yes	—N/a	Yes	Yuth	Yes	Yuth	
2018	K1TCHEN	"FRYPAN (Feat. Double K, Microdot)"	Yes	Microdot, Double K	Yes	HolyMoley	—N/a	—N/a	
2018	K1TCHEN	"Payback (Feat. Coogie)"	Yes	Coogie	Yes	Yuth	Yes	Yuth	
2018	K1TCHEN	"SCARYNIGHTT"	Yes	—N/a	Yes	Cho Yong-ho	Yes	Cho Yong-ho	
2018	K1TCHEN	"SPARRING"	Yes	—N/a	Yes	Yuth	Yes	Yuth	
2018	K1TCHEN	"Pavlov's Dog (Feat. Cold Bay, Basick)"	Yes	Cold Bay, Basick	Yes	Yuth	Yes	Yuth	
2018	NIRVANA	"Alcohol"	Yes	—N/a	Yes	Yuth	—N/a	—N/a	
2018	NIRVANA	"CHAMELEON"	Yes	—N/a	Yes	Cho Yong-ho, Iver	—N/a	—N/a	
2018	NIRVANA	"Nirvana"	Yes	—N/a	Yes	Cho Yong-ho, Park Ji-min	—N/a	—N/a	
2018	NIRVANA	"Payday"	Yes	OLNL	Yes	Yugh, Choi Cho-a	—N/a	—N/a	
2018	NIRVANA	"Ravi Da Loca"	Yes	—N/a	Yes	SAM&SP3CK	—N/a	—N/a	
2018	NIRVANA	"Where Am I (Feat. Microdot)"	Yes	Microdot	Yes	Cho Yong-ho	—N/a	—N/a	
2018	NIRVANA	"Boiling Point (끓는점)""	Yes	Kwon Min-sik	Yes	Cho Yong-ho	Yes	Cho Yong-ho	
2018	—N/a	"RAVI Logo"	Yes	—N/a	Yes	Yuth	—N/a	—N/a	
2019	BRAG (feat. Chillin Homie, Prod. Flash Note)	"BRAG (feat. Chillin Homie, Prod. Flash Note)"	Yes	Chillin Homie	Yes	Flash Note, Chillin Homie	No	Flash Note	
2019	FASHIONABLE	"Fashionable"	Yes	Cold Bay, Xydo	Yes	Cold Bay, GXXD, Xydo	No	GXXD	
2019	Leopard	"Leopard (Feat. Solar of Mamamoo)"	Yes	Solar	Yes	D.ONE, Solar, Cosmic Boy	No	D.ONE, Cosmic Boy	
2019	LIMITLESS Part. 1	"BADA$$ (feat. Cold Bay, Prod. Flash Note)"	Yes	Cold Bay	Yes	Flash Note, Cold Bay	No	Flash Note	
2019	LIMITLESS Part. 1	"Limitless (Feat. Sik K, Xydo)"	Yes	Kwon Min-sik, Xydo	Yes	Yuth, Kwon Min-sik, Xydo	Yes	Yuth	
2019	LIMITLESS Part. 1	"Venom (Feat. Ja Mezz)"	Yes	Ja Mezz	Yes	Dakshood, Ja Mezz	No	Dakshood	
2019	LIMITLESS Part. 1	"NZT"	Yes	—N/a	Yes	Yuth	Yes	Yuth	
2019	LIMITLESS Part. 1	"Zombie""	Yes	—N/a	Yes	Flash Note	No	Flash Note	
2019	LIMITLESS Part. 2	"DRUG (feat. Kim Hyo Eun) [Prod. by Cool Cat]"	Yes	Kim Hyo-eun	Yes	Cool Cat, Kim Hyo-eun	No	Cool Cat	
2019	LIMITLESS Part. 2	"How Could You (feat. Raf Sandou)"	Yes	Seung Hwan-chung	Yes	Yuth, Seung Hwan-chung	Yes	Yuth	
2019	LIMITLESS Part. 2	"Turn On The Light (Feat. TWLV)"	Yes	TWLV	Yes	Yuth, TWLV	Yes	Yuth	
2019	LIMITLESS Part. 2	"각성 (Arousal)"	Yes	—N/a	Yes	Yuth	Yes	Yuth	
2019	Live	"Live (Feat. Chung Ha)"	Yes	—N/a	Yes	Yuth	Yes	Yuth, Jeong Dong-hwan	
2019	NIRVANA II	"O.I"	Yes	—N/a	Yes	Bang Jin-woo	No	Bang Jin-woo	
2019	NIRVANA II	"Unicorn (Feat. Cold Bay)"	Yes	Cold Bay	Yes	Cold Bay, Bang Jin-woo	No	Bang Jin-woo	
2019	NIRVANA II	"Still Nirvana (Feat. Haon, Xydo)"	Yes	Haon	Yes	Puff, Haon, Xydo	Yes	Puff	
2019	NIRVANA II	"Two Tone Drip (Feat. Park Ji-woo, Make A Movie)"	Yes	Make A Movie	Yes	Cosmic Boy	No	Cosmic Boy	
2019	NIRVANA II	"VERSA"	Yes	—N/a	Yes	Yuth	Yes	Yuth	
2019	NIRVANA II	"Service (고객)"	Yes	—N/a	Yes	Yuth	Yes	Yuth	
2019	Q&A (Feat. Zene The Zilla)	"Q&A (Feat. Zene The Zilla)"	Yes	Zene The Zilla	Yes	Yuth	Yes	Yuth	
2019	R.ook Book	"Hoodie (Feat. Xydo, Raf Sandou)"	Yes	Xydo, Seung Hwan-chung	Yes	Yuth	Yes	Yuth	
2019	R.ook Book	"L.A.Y.E.R.E.D (Feat. SAAY)"	Yes	Kwon So-hee	Yes	Yuth, Kwon So-hee	Yes	Yuth	
2019	R.ook Book	"R.ook Book"	Yes	—N/a	Yes	Cho Yong-ho	Yes	Cho Yong-ho	
2019	R.ook Book	"Runway"	Yes	—N/a	Yes	Yuth	Yes	Yuth	
2019	R.ook Book	"Tuxedo"	Yes	—N/a	Yes	Cho Yong-ho	Yes	Cho Yong-ho	
2019	R.ook Book	"U-NIVERSE (Cosmocorps) (Feat. Rick Bridges)"	Yes	Rick Bridges	Yes	Cho Yong-ho	Yes	Cho Yong-ho	
2019	R.ook Book	"See Through (Feat. Cold Bay)"	Yes	Cold Bay	Yes	Cho Yong-ho	Yes	Cho Yong-ho	
2019	Rockstar	"Rockstar"	Yes	—N/a	Yes	Yuth	Yes	Yuth	
2019	Vacay	"Vacay"	Yes	—N/a	Yes	Cho Yong-ho	Yes	Cho Yong-ho	
2020	EL DORADO	"WHERE AM I (GROOVL1N REMIX) (Bonus Track)"	Yes	Cold Bay, Xydo	Yes	Puff, Cold Bay, Xydo	Yes	Puff	
2020	EL DORADO	"Doberman (Feat. G2)"	Yes	G2	Yes	G2, Flash Note	No	Flash Note	
2020	EL DORADO	"Dream Catcher (Feat. Reddy, Bill Stax)"	Yes	Reddy, Bill Stax	Yes	Reddy, Bill Stax, Flash Note	No	Flash Note	
2020	EL DORADO	"El Dorado (Prod. Puff)"	Yes	—N/a	Yes	Puff	Yes	Puff	
2020	EL DORADO	"Full Time Digga (Feat. Sokodomo, Raf Sandou)"	Yes	Sokodomo, Seung Hwan-chung	Yes	Flash Note, Sokodomo, Seung Hwan-chung	No	Flash Note	
2020	EL DORADO	"GODDESS (Feat. Xydo)"	Yes	Xydo	Yes	Clam, Xydo	No	Clam	
2020	EL DORADO	"LO-FI (Feat. Sik K)"	Yes	Kwon Min-sik	Yes	Kwon Min-sik, Puff, Flash Note	—N/a	Puff, Flash Note	
2020	EL DORADO	"PO$EI (Feat. Khundi Panda)"	Yes	Khundi Panda	Yes	Puff, Khundi Panda	Yes	Puff	
2020	EL DORADO	"Rockstar (Feat. Paloalto)"	Yes	Paloalto	Yes	Yuth, Paloalto	Yes	Yuth	
2020	EL DORADO	"여포 (YEOPO) (Feat. Rohann, Chillin Homie)"	Yes	ROHANN, Chillin Homie	Yes	QUIZQUIZ, Rohann, Chillin Homie	No	QUIZQUIZ	
2020	EL DORADO	"칼춤 (劍舞) (KNIFE DANCE) (Feat. Chillin Homie, Cold Bay, Xydo)"	Yes	Cold Bay, Xydo, Chillin HOmie	Yes	Cold Bay, Clam, Xydo, Chillin Homie	No	Clam	
2020	Good Girl Episode 2	"Gray Zone (Feat. Chillin Homie)"	Yes	Chillin Homie	Yes	QUIZQUIZ, Chillin Homie	No	QUIZQUIZ	
2020	Leaf (Feat. 10CM)	"Leaf (Feat. 10CM)"	Yes	—N/a	Yes	Yuth, Clam	Yes	Yuth, Clam	
2020	PARADISE	"If I (feat. Big Naughty)"	Yes	Big Naughty	Yes	Woogie, Big Naughty	No	Woogie	
2020	PARADISE	"Paradise (Feat. Ha Seong-un)"	Yes	—N/a	Yes	Puff, Xydo	Yes	Puff	
2020	PARADISE	"Question Mark"	Yes	—N/a	Yes	Clam	No	Clam	
2020	PARADISE	"Water Gun"	Yes	—N/a	Yes	Clam	No	Clam	
2020	PARADISE	"U-Turn"	Yes	—N/a	Yes	Yuth	Yes	Yuth	
2020	PAUSE	"PAUSE"	Yes	—N/a	Yes	Malone Chase	—N/a	—N/a	
2020	Rain Drop (비♡)	"Rain Drop (비♡) (Feat. Lee Na-eun of APRIL)"	Yes	—N/a	Yes	QUIZQUIZ	No	QUIZQUIZ	
2021	ANI	"ANI (Feat. Soyeon ((G)-IDLE))"	Yes	Soyeon	Yes	Yuth, Soyeon, Clam	—N/a	—N/a	
2021	BEOM (범)	"BEOM (범) (Feat. Chillin Homie, Kid Milli)"	Yes	Kid Milli, Chillin Homie	Yes	QUIZQUIZ, Kid Milli, Chillin Homie	No	QUIZQUIZ	
2021	ROSES	"CARDIGAN (Feat. Wonstein)"	Yes	Wonstein	Yes	Yuth, Wonstein, Clam	—N/a	—N/a	
2021	ROSES	"CHEE$E (Feat. BLNK & Ahn Byeong Woong)"	Yes	BLNK, Ahn Byeong-woong	Yes	Puff, BLNK, Ahn Byeong-woong	—N/a	—N/a	
2021	ROSES	"I Don't Deny"	Yes	—N/a	Yes	Mother Piece	—N/a	—N/a	
2021	ROSES	"Roses"	Yes	—N/a	Yes	Puff, Clam	—N/a	—N/a	
2021	ROSES	"Flower Garden"	Yes	—N/a	Yes	Clam, Hwang Hyun	—N/a	—N/a	
2021	ROSES	"Freezing Point (Feat. Xydo)"	Yes	Xydo	Yes	QUIZQUIZ, Xydo	—N/a	—N/a	
2022	Block Party	"Block Party"	Yes	—N/a	Yes	Yuth, Clam	—N/a	—N/a	
2022	BYE (Feat. Whee In)	"BYE (Feat. Whee In)"	Yes	—N/a	Yes	Puff, Clam	—N/a	—N/a	
2022	Holiday	"Holiday"	Yes	—N/a	Yes	Yuth	—N/a	—N/a	
2022	Love & Fight	"1, 2, 3 (Feat. Xydo)"	Yes	Xydo	Yes	Yang Hai, Jung Kuk Yeong, Xydo	—N/a	—N/a	
2022	Love & Fight	"CANNONBALL (Feat. Paul Blanco)"	Yes	Paul Blanco	Yes	Puff, Paul Blanco, Clam	—N/a	—N/a	
2022	Love & Fight	"Drowning In The Rain"	Yes	—N/a	Yes	QUIZQUIZ	—N/a	—N/a	
2022	Love & Fight	"GUNS"	Yes	—N/a	Yes	Yuth, Clam	—N/a	—N/a	
2022	Love & Fight	"Let Me Down Slowly (Feat. Cold Bay)"	Yes	Cold Bay	Yes	Puff, Cold Bay, Clam	—N/a	—N/a	
2022	Love & Fight	"Love Hate Fight (Feat. Nafla)"	Yes	Nafla	Yes	Yuth, Nafla, Clam	—N/a	—N/a	
2022	Love & Fight	"Virus (Feat. Justhis)"	Yes	Justhis	Yes	Justhis, Yuth, Clam	—N/a	—N/a	
2022	Love & Fight	"Warrior"	Yes	—N/a	Yes	Puff, Clam	—N/a	—N/a	
2022	Love & Fight	"What's My Problem"	Yes	—N/a	Yes	Traye	—N/a	—N/a	
2022	Love & Fight	"Winner (Feat. Ash Island)"	Yes	Yun Jin-young	Yes	Yuth, Yun Jin-young	—N/a	—N/a	
2022	Love & Holiday	"CAMERA"	Yes	—N/a	Yes	Puff	—N/a	—N/a	
2022	Love & Holiday	"Dumb Dumb Dumb"	Yes	—N/a	Yes	Puff	—N/a	—N/a	
2022	Love & Holiday	"Joe Goldberg"	Yes	—N/a	Yes	Puff	—N/a	—N/a	
2022	Love & Holiday	"Kiss You"	Yes	—N/a	Yes	Hedin Hansen, Rasmus Gregersen, Madison Yanofsky, Navvy	—N/a	—N/a	
2022	Love & Holiday	"Calm"	Yes	—N/a	Yes	Clam, Polodared	—N/a	—N/a	
2022	Love & Holiday	"Don't Wake Me Up (Feat. Jayci Yucca)"	Yes	Jayci Yucca	Yes	Yuth, Lee Seung-jae, Jayci Yucca	—N/a	—N/a	
2022	Love & Holiday	"Do Not Disturb Mode (Feat. Ourealgoat, 365lit & Blase)"	Yes	—N/a	Yes	Blase, Ourealgoat, Clam, 365Lit	—N/a	—N/a	
2022	Love & Holiday	"Love Hate Relationship"	Yes	—N/a	Yes	Yuth, QUIZQUIZ	—N/a	—N/a	
2022	Revoir	"Revoir"	Yes	—N/a	Yes	Puff	—N/a	—N/a	
2022	안녕 (WHO WE ARE)	"안녕 (WHO WE ARE)"	Yes	—N/a	Yes	Puff, Clam, Sang Yoon-yeo	—N/a	—N/a	
2026	Dust	"Dust"	Yes	—N/a	Yes	Bloom, Revz Dutch	—N/a	—N/a	

== Other work ==
All song credits are adapted from the Korea Music Copyright Association's database unless stated otherwise.

=== Collaboration releases ===
Year	Album	Song	Artist	Lyrics		Composition		Arrangement		Notes
Year	Album	Song	Artist	Credited	With	Credited	With	Credited	With	Notes
2019	Asura (阿修羅)	"Asura" (阿修羅)	RAVI, Chillin Homie, Xydo, Cold Bay	Yes	Cold Bay, Xydo, Chillin Homie	Yes	QUIZQUIZ, Cold Bay, Xydo, Chillin Homie	No	QUIZQUIZ	
2019	BANDI & LUNI'S	"BANDI & LUNI′S (Prod. by PUFF)"	RAVI, Cold Bay, Xydo	Yes	Cold Bay, Xydo	Yes	Puff, Cold Bay, Xydo	No	Puff	
2019	The Love of Spring	"BLOSSOM (Prod. GroovyRoom)"	GFRIEND Eunha, RAVI	Yes	Kang Eun-ju, JQ	Yes	GroovyRoom, WOODZ	No	GroovyRoom	
2020	Summer Memories (from Cool Summer Project)	"Summer Memories"	RAVI, Kim Namjoo, Kang Seung-sik	Yes	Yoon Il-sang	No	Yoon Il-sang	No	Yoon Il-sang	
2020	What About You	"What About You"	RAVI, Ailee	Yes	Ailee	Yes	Ailee, Noden, Puff	No	Noden, Puff	
2022	Dessert Tape	"Your Dream"	RAVI, Xydo	Yes	Xydo	Yes	Puff, Xydo	—N/a	—N/a	
2022	Dessert Tape	"Calm"	RAVI, Xydo	Yes	Xydo	Yes	Puff, Xydo	—N/a	—N/a	
2022	Dessert Tape	"Accent (Feat. Leellamarz)"	RAVI, Xydo	Yes	Leellamarz	Yes	Yuth, Toil, Leellamarz, Xydo	—N/a	—N/a	
2022	Dessert Tape	"빈자리 (I'm on your side) (Feat. Suen)"	RAVI, Xydo	Yes	Xydo, Suen, Rhode White	Yes	Yuth, Xydo, Suen, Rhode White	—N/a	—N/a	
2022	Dessert Tape	"Calm"	RAVI, Xydo	Yes	Xydo	Yes	Puff, Xydo	—N/a	—N/a	
2022	Hwang Je-sung's Hwangje Power	"Hwang Je-sung's Hwangje Power Song"	RAVI, Xydo	Yes	—N/a	Yes	Clam, Sang Yoon-yeo	—N/a	—N/a	

=== As a featured artist ===
Year	Album	Song	Artist	Lyrics		Composition		Arrangement	
Year	Album	Song	Artist	Credited	With	Credited	With	Credited	With
2016	Use Me	"Use Me (Feat. RAVI of VIXX)"	Kim Wan-sun	Yes	Bae Young-joon	No	Chun Da-won, Kiggen	No	Chun Da-won, Kiggen
2017	ESBEE _ B-DAY	"ESBEE _ B-DAY (Feat. RAVI)"	ESBEE	Yes	ESBEE	No	ESBEE, O'Neal	No	ESBEE, O'Neal
2017	Prophet	"Blah Blah (Feat. RAVI of VIXX)"	Microdot	Yes	Microdot	No	Stoner, Microdot	No	Stoner
2019	Chasing	"TML (Feat. RAVI)"	Cold Bay	Yes	Cold Bay	No	Cool Cat, Cold Bay	No	Cool Cat
2019	Melody Bookstore, Pt. 4	"Goin' Crazy (Feat. RAVI)"	Park Kyung	Yes	Park Kyung, Suran, Song Yu-bin	No	Park Kyung, Suran, Vinternoon	No	Vinternoon
2020	Humming	"Humming (Feat. RAVI)"	GREE	Yes	Gree, On The Road	Yes	Gree, On The Road	No	Gree, On The Road
2020	Mint Chocolate	"Mint Chocolate (Feat. RAVI)"	Xydo	Yes	Xydo	Yes	Yuth, Xydo	—N/a	—N/a
2020	Twerking	"Twerking (Feat. RAVI)"	TWLV	Yes	TWLV	No	TWLV, Ian Welcome	No	Ian Welcome
2021	If I Were Rich (Feat. RAVI)	"If I Were Rich (Feat. RAVI)"	South Club	Yes	Nam Tae-hyun	No	Nam Tae-hyun	No	Hwang Tae-young, Lee Hyun-seung
2021	ParaPara Queen (DGG X Flex M)	"ParaPara Queen (Feat. RAVI)"	Son Min-su	Yes	Jung Hee-sun	No	Kim Kun-woo	No	Bick San-cho, Jo Myeong-sang
2021	Shy Ddoong	"Shy Ddoong (Feat. RAVI)"	BOOKKU DDOONG	Yes	—N/a	Yes	Yuth, Clam	—N/a	—N/a
2022	Love & Love	"My Love (Feat. RAVI)"	Seo In-guk	Yes	Seo In-guk, Mo Sang-hoon, Park Kyung-hyun	No	Seo In-guk, Mo Sang-hoon, Park Kyung-hyun	No	Park Kyung-hyun
2026	Girlfriend	"Girlfriend (with RAVI)"	Suen	Yes	Suen	Yes	Suen, Rhode, Jimmy!	—N/a	—N/a

=== Releases for other artists ===
Year	Album	Song	Artist	Lyrics		Composition		Arrangement	
Year	Album	Song	Artist	Credited	With	Credited	With	Credited	With
2015	When It Rains	"When It Rains"	Melody Day	Yes	Cleanup Hitter	No	Cleanup Hitter	No	Cleanup Hitter
2016	+64	"Wave"	Microdot	Yes	Oh Seung-taek, Microdot	No	Microdot, Zesty	No	Zesty
2016	Discarded Feeling	"Discarded Feeling"	Kiggen	Yes	Kiggen, Kebee, Minos	No	ESBEE, Kiggen	No	Kiggen
2017	Act. 2 Narcissus	"Hate You"	Gugudan	Yes	—N/a	Yes	Cho Yong-ho	—N/a	—N/a
2017	Clumsy	"Clumsy"	Koh Nayoung	Yes	Yuth	Yes	Yuth	Yes	Yuth
2018	Act. 5 New Action	"Do It"	gugudan	Yes	—N/a	Yes	Cho Yong-ho	Yes	Cho Yong-ho
2018	CHAMPAGNE	"CHAMPAGNE (Feat. 雨)"	DJ ASTER	Yes	—N/a	Yes	Yuth, ASTER	Yes	Yuth, ASTER
2018	Don't Worry	"Don't Worry"	Gunmin X Heedo	Yes	Heedo	Yes	Yuth	Yes	Yuth
2018	Summer Dream	"Talk To Me"	ELRIS	Yes	—N/a	Yes	Cho Yong-ho, Inner Child	—N/a	—N/a
2019	The Park In the Night Part Three	"Recipe For Simon"	GWSN	Yes	—N/a	Yes	Yuth	—N/a	—N/a
2021	AMY	"Don't Teach Me"	Ailee, Whee In	Yes	Ailee	Yes	Hwang Hyun	—N/a	—N/a
2021	Solo Christmas	"Solo Christmas"	Ailee, Whee In	Yes	—N/a	Yes	Park Sorhee	—N/a	—N/a
2022	D-DAY	"D-DAY"	Whee In	Yes	—N/a	Yes	Marie Ramirez, Jurek Reunamaeki, Elise Cabrera	—N/a	—N/a
2022	SSOOK DDOONG (feat. CHOI YOOJUNG (Weki Meki))	"SSOOK DDOONG (feat. CHOI YOOJUNG (Weki Meki))"	BOOKKU DDOONG	Yes	—N/a	Yes	Puff	—N/a	—N/a
2022	WHEE	"Deserve (Interlude)"	Whee In	Yes	—N/a	Yes	Puff	—N/a	—N/a
2022	WHEE	"Letter Filled With Light"	Whee In	No	Whee In	Yes	Nicklas Eklund, Cecilia Naesman	—N/a	—N/a
2022	WHEE	"Make Me Happy"	Whee In	Yes	—N/a	Yes	Puff, Xydo, Anthony Klempner, Laura Whiteacre, Eyden Ross	—N/a	—N/a
2022	WHEE	"Pastel"	Whee In	Yes	Ahn Young-joo, Vacation, Moon Daeun, William Jackson, Martyn Crowhurst, Grace, Tighe Cleo	Yes	William Jackson, Martyn Crowhurst, Cleo Tighe	—N/a	—N/a
2026	BE EDGE, BE EVOLVED	"BE EDGE, BE EVOLVED"	베베(BEBE)	—N/a	—N/a	Yes	—N/a	Yes	—N/a
2026	Beyond The Shell	"Beyond The Shell"	Sung Han-bin	—N/a	—N/a	Yes	—N/a	Yes	—N/a

== See also ==
- List of songs recorded by VIXX
