= List of awards and nominations received by VIXX =

VIXX awards and nominations
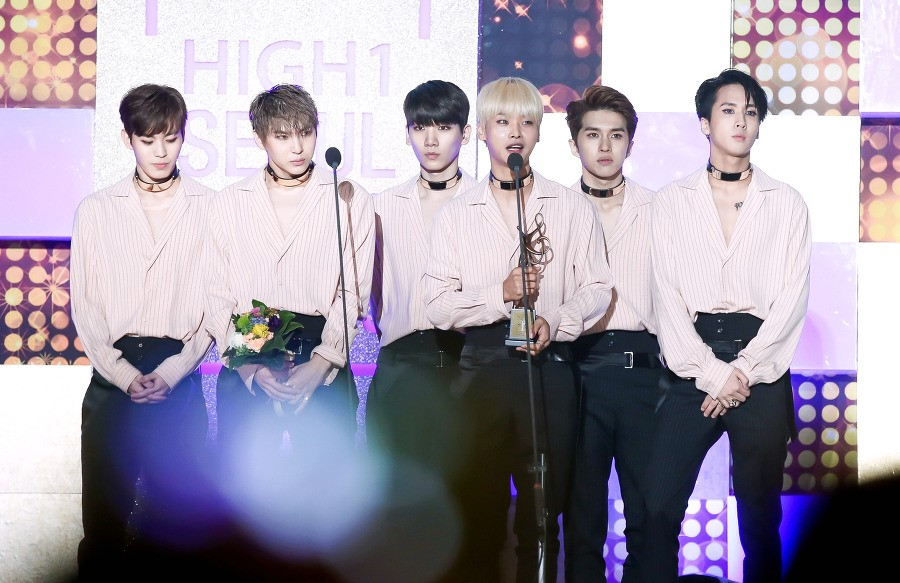
- VIXX at the 25th Seoul Music Awards (2016)
Awards and nominations
Award	Wins	Nominations
Golden Disc	3	12
MAMA	0	8
MTV Korea	1	1
Seoul Music	4	9
Gaon Chart Music Awards	1	8
Korea Cultural Entertainment Awards	1	0
Melon music Awards	0	1
Hanteo Awards	0	1
YinYueTai V Chart Awards	2	1
China Music Awards	1	0
Japan Gold Disc Awards	1	1
Hallyu Japan Music Awards	0	1
STARCAST Awards	1	0
Mp3 Music Awards	0	1
Seoul Ambassador Day Awards	1	0
MTV Europe Music Awards	0	2
Daum Official Fancafe Awards	1	0
Asia Artist Awards	2	2
Korean Entertainment Arts Awards	1	0
Soribada Awards	1	1
KMF Awards	1	0

Totals (Note: Certain award groups do not simply award one winner. They acknowledge several different recipients, have runners-up, and have third place. Since this is a specific recognition and is different from losing an award, runner-up mentions are considered wins in this award tally. For simplification and to avoid errors, each award in this list has been presumed to have had a prior nomination.)
- Wins: 23
- Nominations: 72

This is a list of awards and nominations received by VIXX, a six-member South Korean boy band, formed by Jellyfish Entertainment. They started to gain recognition in 2013, a year after their debut, releasing a single album, an EP, a repackaged EP and finally, a full-length album. VIXX debuted new material on a quarterly basis during that year, finally winning their first music show award with "Voodoo Doll" in Music Bank. VIXX have been recipients of 23 awards from South Korea and International events. VIXX also received 30 wins on South Korea's televised music programs.

== Korean ==
Award ceremony	Year	Category	Nominee / work	Result	Ref.
Asia Artist Awards	2016	Best Celebrity Award	"Dynamite" and "Fantasy"	Won	
Asia Artist Awards	2016	Popularity Award	VIXX	Nominated	
Asia Artist Awards	2017	Best Celebrity Award	"Shangri-La"	Won	
Asia Artist Awards	2017	Popularity Award	VIXX	Nominated	
Daum Official Fancafe Award	2015	Best Fandom Award	VIXX	Won	
Gaon Chart Music Awards	2013	4th Quarter Best Selling Record Award	"Voodoo Doll"	Nominated	
Gaon Chart Music Awards	2014	2nd Quarter Best Selling Record Award	"Eternity"	Nominated	
Gaon Chart Music Awards	2014	4th Quarter Best Selling Record Award	"Error"	Nominated	
Gaon Chart Music Awards	2015	Hot Performance of the Year Award	VIXX	Won	
Gaon Chart Music Awards	2015	Popularity Award	VIXX	Nominated	
Gaon Chart Music Awards	2016	Popularity Award	VIXX	Nominated	
Gaon Chart Music Awards	2016	Artist of the Year (Album Division)	VIXX	Nominated	
Gaon Chart Music Awards	2016	3rd Quarter Best Selling Record Award	Hades	Nominated	
Gaon Chart Music Awards	2017	2nd Quarter Best Selling Record Award	Shangri-La	Nominated	
Golden Disc Awards	2014	Disc Bonsang Award	Jekyll	Nominated	
Golden Disc Awards	2014	Popularity Award	VIXX	Nominated	
Golden Disc Awards	2015	Disc Bonsang Award	Eternity	Won	
Golden Disc Awards	2015	Digital Bonsang Award	Eternity	Nominated	
Golden Disc Awards	2016	Disc Bonsang Award	Error	Won	
Golden Disc Awards	2016	Popularity Award	VIXX	Nominated	
Golden Disc Awards	2016	Global Popularity Award	VIXX	Nominated	
Golden Disc Awards	2017	Disc Bonsang Award	Chained Up	Won	
Golden Disc Awards	2017	Popularity Award	VIXX	Nominated	
Golden Disc Awards	2017	Global Popularity Award	VIXX	Nominated	
Golden Disc Awards	2019	Popularity Award	VIXX	Nominated	
Golden Disc Awards	2019	NetEase Most Popular K-pop Star	VIXX	Nominated	
Hanteo Awards	2013	Singer Award	VIXX	5th	
Interpark Awards	2017	Best Album	Shangri-La	Nominated	
Korea Cultural Entertainment Awards	2014	K-POP Top Ten Singer award	VIXX	Won	
Korean Entertainment Arts Awards	2017	Best Boy Group	VIXX	Won	
Melon Music Awards	2017	Stage of the Year	VIXX LIVE FANTASIA DAYDREAM	Nominated	
Mnet Asian Music Awards	2014	Best Dance Performance - Male Group	"Eternity"	Nominated	
Mnet Asian Music Awards	2014	Song of the Year	"Eternity"	Nominated	
Mnet Asian Music Awards	2015	Best Dance Performance - Male Group	"Love Equation"	Nominated	
Mnet Asian Music Awards	2015	Song of the Year	"Love Equation"	Nominated	
Mnet Asian Music Awards	2016	Best Dance Performance - Male Group	"Fantasy"	Nominated	
Mnet Asian Music Awards	2016	Song of the Year	"Fantasy"	Nominated	
Mnet Asian Music Awards	2017	Best Dance Performance - Male Group	"Shangri-La"	Nominated	
Mnet Asian Music Awards	2017	Song of the Year	"Shangri-La"	Nominated	
SBS MTV Best of the Best	2013	Best Rookie Group	VIXX	Won	
SBS MTV Best of the Best	2014	Best Music Video	"Error"	Nominated	
Seoul Embassies Day Awards	2015	Hanbit Awards	VIXX (along with Apink and Rainbow)	Won	
Seoul Music Awards	2013	New Artist Award	VIXX	Nominated	
Seoul Music Awards	2014	Bonsang Award	Hyde	Won	
Seoul Music Awards	2014	Popularity Award	VIXX	Nominated	
Seoul Music Awards	2015	Bonsang Award	Error	Won	
Seoul Music Awards	2015	Popularity Award	VIXX	Nominated	
Seoul Music Awards	2015	Hallyu Special Award	VIXX	Nominated	
Seoul Music Awards	2016	Bonsang Award	Chained Up	Won	
Seoul Music Awards	2016	Popularity Award	VIXX	Nominated	
Seoul Music Awards	2016	Hallyu Special Award	VIXX	Nominated	
Seoul Music Awards	2017	Bonsang Award	"Dynamite"	Won	
Seoul Music Awards	2017	Popularity Award	VIXX	Nominated	
Seoul Music Awards	2017	Fandom School Award	VIXX	Nominated	
Seoul Music Awards	2017	Hallyu Special Award	VIXX	Nominated	
Seoul Music Awards	2018	Bonsang Award	Shangri-La	Nominated	
Seoul Music Awards	2018	Popularity Award	VIXX	Nominated	
Seoul Music Awards	2018	K-Wave Popularity Award	VIXX	Nominated	
Soribada Best K-Music Awards	2017	Best Artist of the Year	VIXX	Won	
Soribada Best K-Music Awards	2017	Popularity Award	VIXX	Nominated	
STARCAST Awards	2014	Best Style	VIXX (along with Jang Keun-suk)	Won	

== Chinese ==
Award ceremony	Year	Category	Nominee / work	Result	Ref.
China Music Awards	2016	Hottest Group of the Year	VIXX	Won	
YinYueTai V Chart Awards	2016	Best Performance	"Chained Up"	Won	
YinYueTai V Chart Awards	2017	Hot Trend Group of The Year	VIXX	Won	
YinYueTai V Chart Awards	2017	Most influential group in Asia	VIXX	Nominated	

== Japanese ==
Award ceremony	Year	Category	Nominee / work	Result	Ref.
Hallyu Japanese Music Awards	2013	Best Male Group	VIXX	Nominated	
Japan Gold Disc Awards	2015	Best 3 New Artists in Asia	VIXX (with Apink and BTS)	Won	
Japan Gold Disc Awards	2015	Best New Artists in Asia	VIXX	Nominated	
KMF Awards	2017	Best Artist Award	VIXX	Won	

== International ==
Award ceremony	Year	Category	Nominee / work	Result	Ref.
Mp3 Music Awards	2014	The Best Asian Music Award	"Turn Around and Look At Me"	Nominated	
MTV Europe Music Awards	2015	Best Korean Act	VIXX	Nominated	
MTV Europe Music Awards	2016	Best Korean Act	VIXX	Nominated	
