= Eau de VIXX =

Studio album by VIXX
- Released: April 17, 2018
- Genre: K-pop; dance-pop
- Length: 39:00
- Language: Korean
- Label: Jellyfish Entertainment; CJ E&M Music

VIXX chronology
Lalala ~ Thank you for your love ~ (ラララ ～愛をありがとう～) (2017)	Eau de VIXX (2018)	Reincarnation (2018)

Singles from Eau de VIXX
- 1. "Scentist" Released: April 17, 2018

Eau de VIXX is the third studio album by South Korean boy band VIXX. Released on April 17, 2018, through Jellyfish Entertainment, the 12-track album comprises eleven songs, including the lead single "Scentist" and the band's 2017 single "Shangri-La", and one instrumental. All songs were written or co-written by Ravi. Vocalists Hyuk and N are credited as the main songwriters for "Good Day" and "Resemble" respectively. It is the band's final Korean-language record to feature vocalist Hongbin, who left in August 2020, and rapper Ravi, who left in April 2023.

The album debuted at number one on the Gaon Album Chart in South Korea and number three on the Billboard World Albums chart in the United States.

== Background and recording ==
Known for being a "concept-dol"—concept-oriented idol band—since debut, producing music and coordinating accompanying visuals for each of their releases based on a particular idea or aesthetic, VIXX decided to tackle "expressing scent through sound and visuals" for their next album's concept. Perfumery and the band's unique style, imagined as a scent, serve as the inspiration for the album. During a media showcase held to commemorate its release, Vocalist N said that all the band members "are keen on perfumes and cosmetics in general. 'All of us have deep interest in perfumes and body cream products. It's a concept that could not fit us any better.'"

According to vocalist Hongbin, the band explored genres very different to everything they had done before, "want[ing] to present a wide range of songs" on the album. Rapper Ravi considers this to be "the biggest differentiating factor". Per Billboard, the album features a mixture of "upbeat, pop and funk tracks and sultry dance songs".

The band members were also more involved in the songwriting and production aspects of the album compared to other releases. Ravi is credited as the sole writer or a co-writer on every track on the album and wrote the rap parts for all of them; Hyuk co-wrote and co-composed "Good Day", with an additional composition credit on "Trigger"; N co-wrote and co-composed "Resemble"; Ken co-composed "Navy & Shining Gold" with Ravi and Hyuk. Several of the tracks were also self-produced by the band members, including "Circle", which credits Ravi as producer. The rapper has said that the band faced many difficulties in persuading their label to allow songs produced by the members on new releases, as management would often reject the songs they submitted for consideration.

== Release ==
On March 30, 2018 (KST), Jellyfish Entertainment shared a poster image, featuring a soft pink and peach color palette, via all of VIXX's social media channels announcing the then-upcoming release of the band's third studio album Eau de VIXX on April 17. The album would mark the band's first full-length work in two-and-a-half years, since Chained Up (2015). The following day, the label published an itemized schedule outlining rollout details for various comeback-related content—photos, the track list, and more—leading up to release day, including "mystery" content labelled with question marks to be revealed on April 11 and 13. News outlet My Daily subsequently reported that the band had begun filming a music video for the album's lead single in Gyeonggi-do later that same day. On April 2, a concept image teaser and history video were simultaneously released. Overlaid with a "shiny wave pattern filter", the photo contained several concept-related items, including an uncorked perfume bottle. The history video, titled VIXX Concept History, was uploaded to the band's official YouTube channel and recounted the different concepts utilized by VIXX from debut to present, before hinting at the newest concept at the very end. A colorful explosion, like paint spreading, burst across the screen in a smokey haze, with the album's title, release date, and the words "Next Concept" appearing onscreen just before the clip ended.

A "Visualizing Teaser" photo, featuring a close-up of Hongbin with his bandmates' intertwined hands covering various parts of his neck and face, was released on April 3, 2018. Contrasting sets of individual and group teaser photos, in colour and black and white respectively, followed on April 4 and 5.

=== Singles ===
The opening track "Scentist", whose title is a portmanteau of scent and artist, was the only single released off the album. A "dark synth-pop tune" with "a lush melody" and "smooth, trap-inspired beat", the perfume-inspired song's lyrics revolve around the scent of a lover. Billboard described the single as "a slow burn" that "languishes in its smoothness before picking up with tinny percussion to lead into the groovy chorus", "intense in its subtlety" and "overflowing with passion". An accompanying music video premiered alongside the single the same day as the album. In it, the band members portray perfumers mixing scents and cocktails in a lab. Interspersed throughout are scenes of "deathly shootouts", a "murderous child", and "sensuous choreography", set against a color palette comprising "dramatic reds, blues, greens, whites, and grays". The choreography features "wrist-sniffing and mirrored movements" indicative of the song's theme. "Scentist" debuted and peaked at number 74 on the Gaon Digital Chart and number 26 on the K-pop Hot 100 in South Korea. It also entered the Billboard World Digital Song Sales chart in the United States at number 10 and peaked at number 6 in its second week; it spent three consecutive weeks on the ranking.

== Commercial performance ==
Eau de VIXX debuted at number one on the week 16 issue of the South Korean Gaon Album Chart, for the period dated April 15–21, 2018. It sold 79,626 (Note: 76,111 regular albums and 3,515 Kino albums) cumulative copies domestically during the last two weeks of April, debuting at number six on the subsequent monthly chart issue. The album sold an additional 17,237 copies in May, charting at number 17.

In Japan, the album entered the weekly Oricon Albums Chart for the period dated April 16–22, 2018, at number 36, with 1,364 sales during its opening week. It also charted in the United States, debuting at numbers 3 and 25 on Billboard's World Albums and Heatseekers Albums charts respectively.

== Promotion ==
A few hours prior to the album's release, VIXX held a media showcase at YES24 Live Hall in Seoul, which was simultaneously broadcast live online via V Live. Two days later, they guested on SBS Power FM's radio show Cultwo Show. In addition to talking about the album, the band performed "Scentist" and "Shangri-La" live in studio.

VIXX began domestic music show promotions for the album on April 20, 2018, with their first appearance on Music Bank in over a year, followed by Inkigayo on April 22, and The Show on April 24. They staged multiple performances of "Scentist" and the b-side track "My Valentine", and won a first place award for the former on The Show.

== Track listing ==
No.	Title	Lyrics	Music	Length
1.	"Scentist" (향; Hyang)	Kim Mi-jin, Ravi	Jake K (Full8loom), Andreas Oberg, Drew Ryan Scott, Nikki Kaelar	3:04
2.	"Odd Sense"	Cho Yoon-kyung, Ravi	Albi Albertsson, Jay & Rudy	3:34
3.	"Silence"	Ravi	Ravi, Jeff Lewis, Joombas, Sun (Joombas)	3:41
4.	"My Valentine"	Kim Ji-hyang, Ravi	Daniel Keonu Park, Matt Wong	3:40
5.	"Circle"	Ravi	Ravi, PUFF	3:17
6.	"Good Day"	Hyuk, Ravi	Hyuk, freckle face	3:01
7.	"Escape"	Ravi	Ravi, Yuth	3:21
8.	"Trigger"	Kim Mi-jin, Ravi	Hyuk, Royal Dive, Jeff Lewis	3:08
9.	"Resemble" (닮아; Dalm-a)	N, Ravi	N, TM, Midnight	3:30
10.	"Navy & Shining Gold"	Ravi	Ken, Ravi, Hyuk, IVeR	3:08
11.	"Shangri-La" (도원경; Do Won Kyung)	Jung Il-ri, Ravi	Devine Channel	3:22
12.	"Scentist" (Inst.)		Jake K, Oberg, Scott, Kaelar	3:04

== Release history ==
Region	Date	Format(s)	Label	Ref.
South Korea	April 17, 2018	CD; Digital download; streaming	Jellyfish Entertainment; CJ E&M Music	
Worldwide	April 17, 2018	Digital download; streaming	Jellyfish	

== See also ==
- List of K-pop albums on the Billboard charts
- List of Gaon Album Chart number ones of 2018
