= Depend on Me (album) =

Studio album by VIXX
- Released: January 27, 2016
- Genre: J-pop; dance-pop
- Language: Japanese; Korean
- Label: Jellyfish Entertainment; CJ Victor Entertainment

VIXX chronology
Chained Up (2015)	Depend on Me (2016)	Zelos (2016)

Singles from Depend on Me
- 1. "Error -Japanese Ver.-" Released: December 10, 2014; 2. "Can't Say" Released: September 9, 2015; 3. "Depend on Me" Released: January 27, 2016

Depend on Me is the first Japanese studio album by South Korean boy band VIXX. It was released on January 27, 2016, under the labels of Jellyfish Entertainment and CJ Victor Entertainment. It features the single "Depend on Me" and previously released Japanese singles "Error" and "Can't Say".

On the same day of the release Depend on Me ranked at number 4 on the Oricon daily album chart. Since then, Depend on Me has risen up the charts and topping at number 1 for January 30. The album charted at number 4 on the weekly album chart for two weeks.

== Background and promotion ==
On November 30, Jellyfish Entertainment and CJ Victor Entertainment revealed that VIXX will be releasing their first original full-length Japanese studio album, Depend on Me, on January 27, 2016. It was revealed that upon release of the album that there would be three versions, a regular edition and two limited editions titled A and B with each having bonus tracks and trading cards featuring a random VIXX member and along with limited edition A there would be a DVD containing the music video and making movie for "Depend on Me" and limited edition B would contain a booklet.

On January 7, 2016 Jellyfish Entertainment and CJ Victor Entertainment revealed the jacket photographs which will be used for all three editions of Depend on Me, and released a teaser to the music video.

On January 23, 2016, a highlight medley for the album was released on CJ Victor Entertainment's official YouTube Channel.

To promote the album VIXX held holding Mini Live & High Touch events in Sapporo, Kobe, Tokyo, Osaka and Fukuoka from January 13, 2016, to January 31, 2016.

== Singles ==
=== "Error" ===
On December 10, 2014, VIXX marked their first official entry into the Japanese market with the release of the Japanese version of "Error" in a single album, which also included the Japanese version of "Youth Hurts" under the Japanese title of "Seishun datte" (Japanese: 青春だって) from their Korean language mini-album, Error. The single peaked at number 6 on the Oricon charts and sold over 19,381 CD copies.

=== "Can't Say" ===
On September 9, 2015, VIXX made their second Japanese comeback with their second Japanese language single "Can't Say". "Can't Say" was the first official song recorded in Japanese by VIXX with original lyrics by SHOW for Digz. Inc Group. The single peaked at number 4 on the Oricon charts and sold over 31,289 CD copies. The single also included the song "Mukae ni ikou" (Japanese: 迎えに行こう). The music video was also released September 9, 2015. A Korean language version was later recorded and released with VIXX's second studio album Chained Up on November 10, 2015.

=== "Depend on Me" ===
"Depend on Me" is the album's lead single. On January 18, 2016, the short version of the music video for "Depend on Me" was released in Japan. The song's lyrics was written by SHOW for Digz, Inc. Group whilst the composition was by Erik Lidbom for Hitfire Production.

== Track listing ==
Depend on Me – Regular edition
No.	Title	Lyrics	Music	Length
1.	"Depend on Me"	SHOW for Digz, Inc. Group	Erik Lidbom for Hitfire Production	3:29
2.	"Echo"	Kim Ji-hyang, Ravi (Japanese Lyrics by SHOW for Digz. Inc Group)	MELODESIGN, Keeproots, fascinating	3:10
3.	"Goodbye Your Love"	SHOW for Digz, Inc. Group	Gravity, Song Youngmin, Lee Changkeun	3:46
4.	"Chained Up" (Japanese version)	Misfit, Ravi (Japanese Lyrics by SHOW for Digz. Inc Group)	Albi Albertsson, Hugo Solis, Farah Achour, Carl Arvid Lehne	3:16
5.	"Error" (Japanese version)	Kim Eana (Japanese Lyrics by SHOW for Digz. Inc Group)	Hwang Se-jun, MELODESIGN	3:48
6.	"Love Letter" (Japanese version)	Kim Ji-hyang, MELODESIGN (Japanese Lyrics by SHOW for Digz. Inc Group)	Hwang Se-jun, MELODESIGN	4:40
7.	"Can't Say"	SHOW for Digz, Inc. Group	Hwang Se-jun (YellowBIRD), Seo Jung-jin, Kim Doo-hyun	3:26
8.	"Spider" (KOR)	Park Sung-hee (Jam Factory (music publisher)), Ravi	Simon Janlov	3:49
9.	"Hot Enough" (KOR)	Kim Min-jin, Ravi	Erik Lidbom, MLC, Deeepsol, Odd.I	3:29
10.	"Stop It Girl" (KOR)	Kim Ji-hyang, Ravi	Erik Lidbom, Andreas Oberg	3:47
11.	"Heaven" (KOR)	Ravi	Ravi	3:18
12.	"Can't Say" (Korean version)	Kim Ji-hyang, Ravi (Original Lyrics by SHOW for Digz. Inc Group)	Hwang Se-jun (Y.Bird), MELODESIGN	3:24

Depend on Me – Limited Edition Type A (bonus track)
No.	Title	Lyrics	Music	Length
12.	"Shadow"	Leo	Leo	3:18

Depend on Me – Limited Edition Type A (DVD)
No.	Title	Length
1.	"Depend on Me" (music video)	3:37
2.	"Depend on Me" (making movie)	18:00

Depend on Me – Limited Edition Type B (bonus track)
No.	Title	Lyrics	Music	Length
12.	"With Me"	Ravi	Ravi	3:30

== Chart performance ==
Chart	Peak position	Sales
Japan (Oricon Daily album chart - January 27)	4	JPN: 17,490
Japan (Oricon Daily album chart - January 30)	1	JPN: 17,490
Japan (Oricon Weekly album chart)	4	JPN: 17,490

== Release history ==
Region	Date	Format	Label
Japan	January 27, 2016	CD+DVD; Digital download	Jellyfish Entertainment; CJ Victor Entertainment
Worldwide	January 27, 2016	Digital download	Jellyfish Entertainment
