= Boys' Record =

Single album by VIXX
- Released: February 24, 2015
- Genre: K-pop; dance-pop
- Length: 15:00
- Label: Jellyfish Entertainment; CJ E&M

VIXX chronology
Error (2014)	Boys' Record (2015)	Chained Up (2015)

Singles from Boys' Record
- 1. "Love Equation" Released: February 24, 2015; 2. "Destiny Love" Released: March 18, 2015

Boys' Record is a special single album by the South Korean boy band VIXX. The album was released on February 24, 2015 under the label of Jellyfish Entertainment. The song "Love Equation" was used to promote the album.

== Background and release ==
On January 16, it was reported that VIXX was planning a February comeback with a new remake album. On February 11, R.ef's "Farewell Formula" was revealed as the title track for the new remake album via VIXX's social media accounts. On February 20, the music video teaser for "Love Equation" was released. On February 24, Boys' Record was released along with the music video for "Love Equation".

On March 18, 2015, VIXX marked their first official entry into the Chinese and Taiwanese markets with the release of "命中注定 (Destiny Love)", a remake of Harlem Yu's "Destiny Love". It was released through Avex Taiwan as a special Chinese edition of Boys' Record. A music video was also released through Avex Taiwan's YouTube Channel.

== Composition ==
The EP consists of three tracks and one instrumental. The first track on the album, "Love Equation", was written by Yoon Sung-hee with the rap being written by Ravi. The song was composed by in house producers Hong Jae-Seon, MELODESIGN and Cho Yong-ho. The story being told by VIXX is how they overcome their breakups and move forward to the future. The second track "On a Cold Night" was composed by Leo and MELODESIGN with lyrics written by Leo and Ravi. The third track "Memory" was composed by MELODESIGN, Lee Seul-ki and Ravi who also wrote the lyrics.

== Promotion ==
VIXX began promoting this single on February 24, 2015. They performed on various music programs including KBS's Music Bank, MBC's Show! Music Core, SBS's Inkigayo, Mnet's, M! Countdown and MBC Music's Show Champion. VIXX gained their first win for "Love Equation" on March 3 on The Show. The song was an all-kill on all the music shows. The group achieved their first triple crown on The Show.

== Track listing ==
The credits are adapted from the official homepage of the group.

No.	Title	Lyrics	Music	Arrangement	Length
1.	"Love Equation" (이별공식; Ibyeolgongsik)	Yoon Sung-hee, Ravi	Hong Jae-Seon	MELODESIGN, Cho Yong-ho	3:29
2.	"On a Cold Night" (차가운 밤에; Chagaun Bame)	Leo, Ravi	Leo	MELODESIGN	3:55
3.	"Memory"	Ravi	Ravi	MELODESIGN, Lee Seul-ki	3:54
4.	"Love Equation" (instrumental)		Hong Jae-Seon	MELODESIGN, Cho Yong-ho	3:29
Total length:					15:00

Chinese version
No.	Title	Length
1.	"Destiny Love" (命中註定)	3:31
2.	"分手方程式" (Love Equation)	3:29
3.	"在寒冷的夜" (On a Cold Night)	3:55
4.	"Memory"	3:54
5.	"Destiny Love" (instrumental)	3:31
6.	"Love Equation" (instrumental)	3:29
Total length:		21:49

== Chart performance ==
Chart	Peak position	Sales
South Korea (Gaon Monthly albums chart	1	KOR: 107,173
South Korea (Gaon Weekly social chart)	1	KOR: 107,173
Taiwan (Five-Music) Weekly album chart	1	KOR: 107,173
Billboard (US World)	9	KOR: 107,173

== Awards and nominations ==
=== Awards ===
Year	Award	Category	Recipient	Result
2015	Mnet Asian Music Awards	Best Dance Performance – Male Group	"Love Equation"	Nominated
2015	Mnet Asian Music Awards	Song of the Year	"Love Equation"	Nominated
2015	MBC Show Champion Awards	Best Audience Rating Stage	"Love Equation"	Won
2015	KMC Radio Awards	Best Male Dance Performance	"Love Equation"	Nominated

=== Music program awards ===
Song	Music show	Date
"Love Equation"	The Show	March 3, 2015
"Love Equation"	The Show	March 10, 2015
"Love Equation"	The Show	March 17, 2015
"Love Equation"	Show Champion	March 4, 2015
"Love Equation"	M! Countdown	March 5, 2015
"Love Equation"	Music Bank	March 6, 2015
"Love Equation"	Show! Music Core	March 7, 2015
"Love Equation"	Inkigayo	March 8, 2015

== Personnel ==
- VIXX – vocals
  - Cha Hakyeon (N) – lead vocals, background vocals
  - Jung Taekwoon (Leo) – main vocals, background vocals, songwriting
  - Lee Jaehwan (Ken)- main vocals, background vocals
  - Kim Wonsik (Ravi) – rap, songwriting
  - Lee Hongbin – vocals
  - Han Sanghyuk (Hyuk) – vocals
- Yoon Sung-hee – songwriting
- Lee Seul-ki – producer, music
- Cho Yong-ho – producer, music
- Hong Jae-Seon – producer, music
- MELODESIGN – producer, music

== Release history ==
Region	Date	Format	Label
Korean single
South Korea	February 24, 2015	CD; Digital download	Jellyfish Entertainment; CJ E&M Music
Worldwide	February 24, 2015	Digital download	Jellyfish Entertainment
Chinese single
China	March 18, 2015	CD, Digital download	Jellyfish Entertainment, Avex Taiwan
Taiwan	March 18, 2015	CD, Digital download	Jellyfish Entertainment, Avex Taiwan

== See also ==
- List of Gaon Album Chart number ones of 2015
