= VIXX =

South Korean boy group

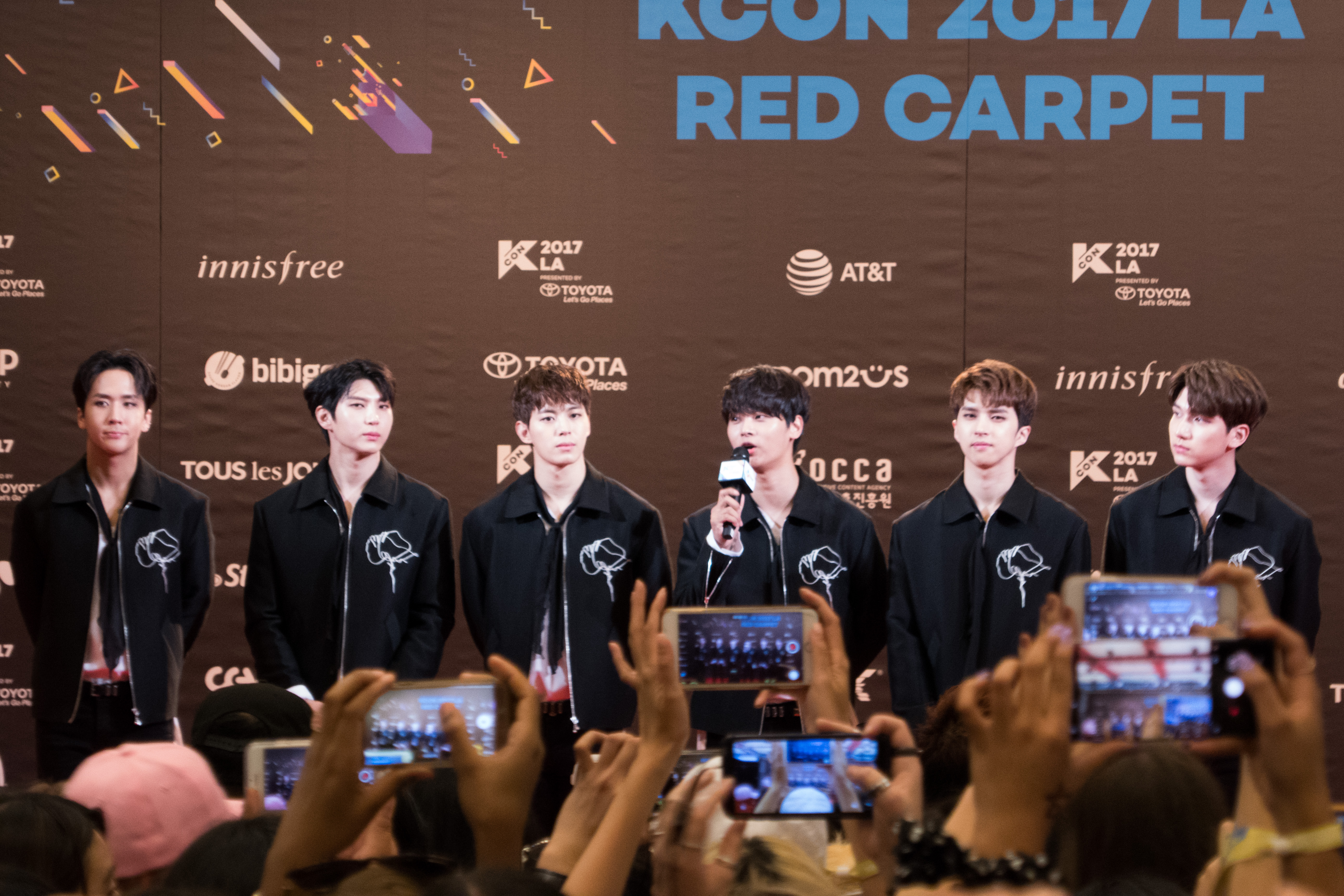
- VIXX in 2017; L–R: Ravi, Leo, Hongbin, N, Ken, Hyuk

Background information
- Origin: Seoul, South Korea
- Genre: K-pop
- Years active: 2012–present
- Label: Jellyfish
- Spinoffs: VIXX LR
- Members: N; Leo; Ken; Hyuk
- Past members: Ravi; Hongbin
- Website: Official Korean website

VIXX (Korean: 빅스 pronounced "vicks"; acronym for "voice, visual, value in excelsis") is a South Korean boy band formed by Jellyfish Entertainment through the 2012 reality show MyDOL. Originally a sextet, the group is currently composed of four members: N, Leo, Ken and Hyuk—former vocalist Hongbin and rapper Ravi left the group in August 2020 and April 2023, respectively. They are predominantly known as a "concept or performance group" whose music, lyrics, choreography, and overall stage performances are crafted together to tell a story or concept.

== History ==
=== 2012–2013: MyDOL, debut, Hyde and Voodoo ===
Prior to their debut, the original six group members were contestants on the Mnet survival reality show MyDOL. The members made several guest appearances in the music videos of fellow artists under Jellyfish Entertainment. N, Leo, Hongbin, and Ravi featured in the music videos for Brian Joo's song "Let This Die"; (Note: N, Leo and Ravi were featured in the Korean version of Brian Joo's "Let This Die" music video, while Hongbin was featured briefly in the English version.) N, Leo, and Ravi featured in Seo In-guk's "Shake It Up"; Hongbin featured in Seo's "Tease Me".

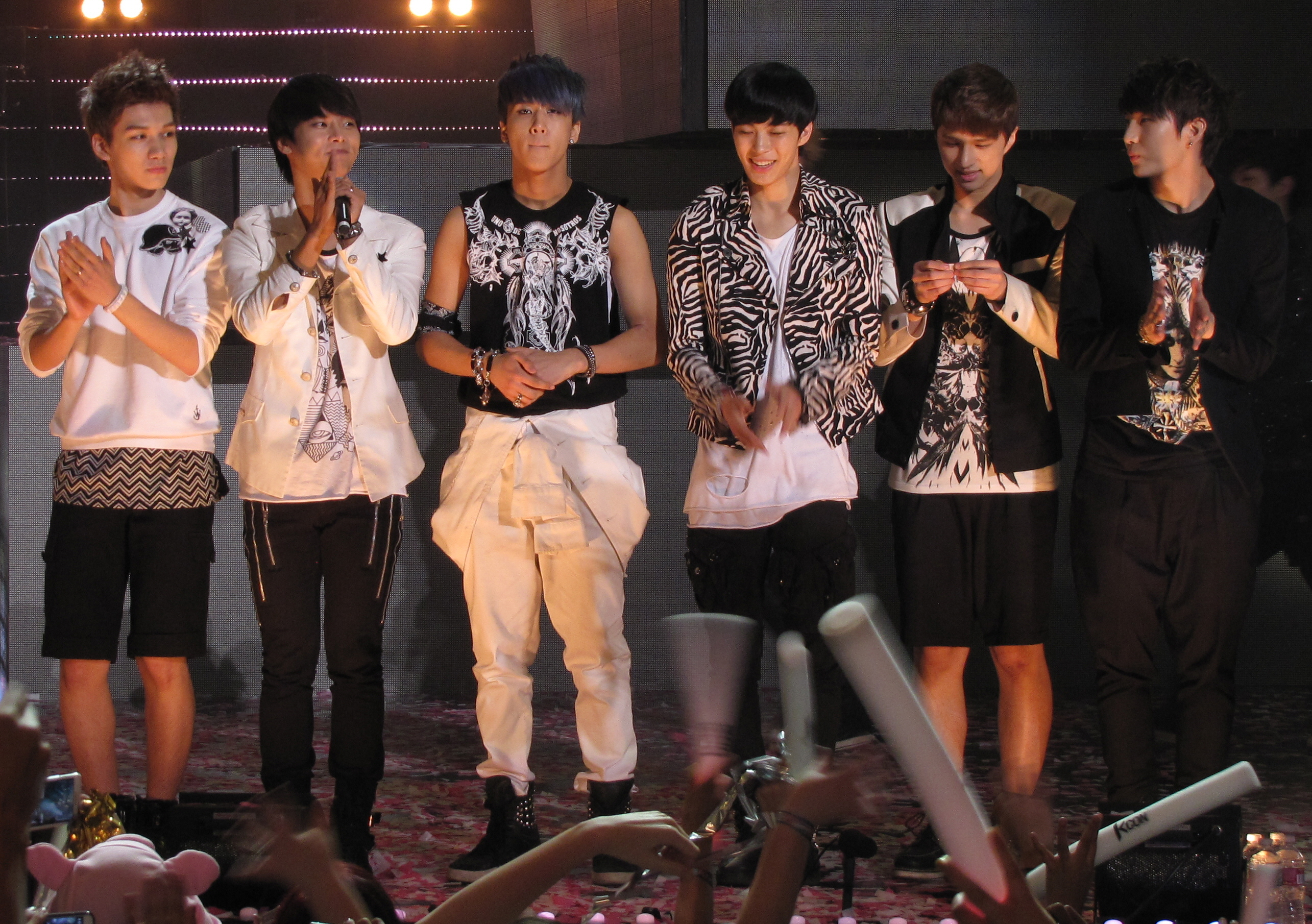
VIXX at KCON 2012 in Irvine, California

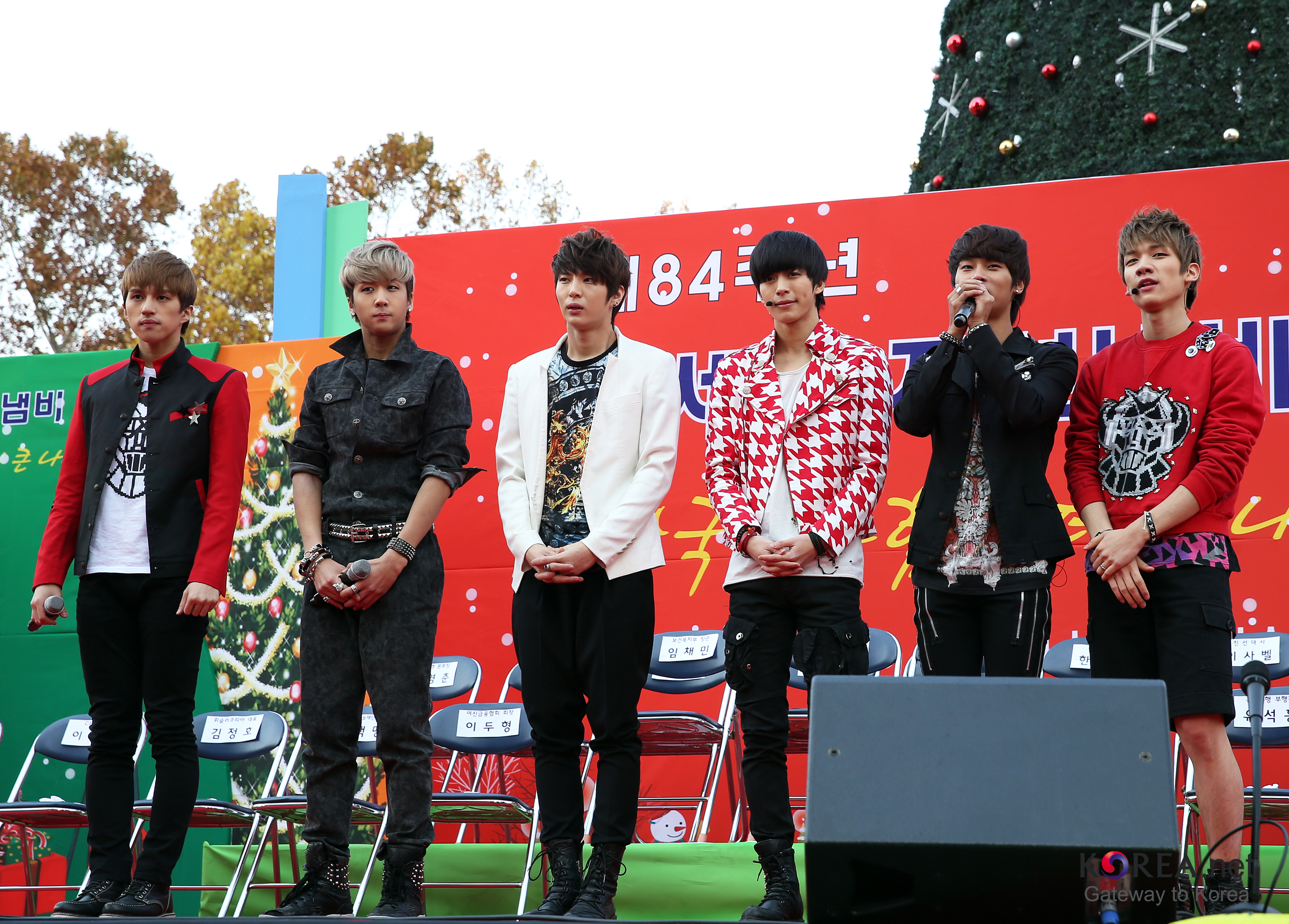
VIXX at The Salvation Army Kettle Appeal Opening Ceremony in South Korea in 2012

VIXX debuted with their first single, "Super Hero" on May 24, 2012, on M Countdown. Their first overseas performance was at the Otakon convention in Baltimore, Maryland on July 27. On August 14, VIXX released their second single album with the song "Rock Ur Body", where Sistar's Dasom appeared in the music video.

VIXX was part of Jellyfish Entertainment's first live concert Jellyfish Live at Tokyo's Zepp Diver City in Japan on September 12, 2012. The group also attended KCON 2012 on October 13. VIXX participated in Jellyfish Entertainment's winter project, Jelly Christmas 2012 Heart Project, with their label mates Lee Seok-hoon, Park Hyo-shin, Seo In-guk, and Sung Si-kyung. The lead single, "Because It's Christmas" was released digitally on December 5, 2012.

On January 6, 2013, VIXX pre-released the single, "Don't Want to Be an Idol", from their third single album On and On. The title track "On and On" was released alongside the album on January 17. Their first mini album Hyde, and its lead single of the same name, was released on May 20. A repackaged album titled Jekyll was later released along with the lead single "G.R.8.U", on July 31. In the months of October and November, VIXX held their first global showcase tour, The Milky Way Global Showcase, which was held in South Korea, Japan, Italy, Sweden, Malaysia, and America.

On November 8, 2013, VIXX pre-released the single "Only U", from their upcoming full-length album Voodoo, and an accompanying music video. The title track "Voodoo Doll" was released on November 20, followed by the album on November 25. On December 6, VIXX earned the top spot on that week's episode of Music Bank with "Voodoo Doll", marking their first music show win since debut. VIXX, along with the artists of Jellyfish Entertainment, released their annual Christmas song on December 10, titled "Winter Confession" for 겨울 고백 (Jelly Christmas 2013). The song topped the Instiz chart for two consecutive weeks, the Billboard K-Pop 100, and two Gaon charts.

=== 2014–2015: Darkest Angels, Error, Boys' Record, VIXX LR and Chained Up ===
On March 5, 2014, Jellyfish Entertainment announced that VIXX would be having a comeback in mid-April or early May. On May 18, the title of VIXX's fourth single album Eternity, was revealed through the group's official fancafe, where the music video teaser was released on May 22. On May 27, the music video for "Eternity" was released along with the album itself.

On May 19, Jellyfish revealed that VIXX will be making their official debut in Japan with a full-length compilation album, Darkest Angels, on July 2. The album charted at number 10 for five consecutive weeks on the Oricon chart and sold 12,332 copies. On June 20, it was announced that VIXX will be attending KCON from August 9 to August 10, this being their second year attending the festival since the first in 2012. They received awards that were voted by their fanclub, such as Best Visual and Best Actor. From July to September, VIXX held their first VIXX Live Fantasia tour Hex Sign visiting Japan and several countries in Europe. On September 25, 2014, Jellyfish Entertainment confirmed that VIXX will be having a comeback on October 14. On October 4, the title song and track list of VIXX's second mini album were revealed via their official website. On October 10, VIXX released the music video teaser for "Error", with the music video later released along with the mini album, Error on October 14. On December 10, VIXX released the Japanese version of "Error" along with the Japanese version of "Youth Hurts".

On February 8, 2015, VIXX was invited to The KKBOX Music Awards that was held at the Taipei Arena. VIXX became the first Korean artist ever to be invited to the event. On February 20, the music video teaser for "Love Equation" was released. On February 24, Boys' Record was released along with the music video for "Love Equation". After its release, the song was an all-kill on all the music shows. The group achieved their first triple crown on The Show. From March to May, VIXX held their second VIXX Live Fantasia tour Utopia in several countries including South Korea, Japan, Philippines, and Singapore. On March 18, 2015, VIXX marked their first official entry into the Chinese and Taiwanese markets with the release of "命中注定 (Destiny Love)", a remake of Harlem Yu's "Destiny Love" as part of Boys' Record. It was released through Avex Taiwan. A music video was also released through Avex Taiwan's YouTube Channel. On July 7, VIXX entered the Chinese and Taiwanese markets again with the Chinese-language version release of "Error" in China through QQ and in Taiwan through KKBOX.

In 2015, VIXX LR was confirmed to be VIXX's first official sub-unit; it is composed of Ravi and Leo. Their debut mini album, Beautiful Liar, was released on August 17, 2015. On August 29, VIXX appeared on the Billboard Social 50 at number 16 and later climbed to number 14.

On September 9, 2015, VIXX made their second Japanese comeback with the single "Can't Say". In late October, Jellyfish announced that VIXX would be having a comeback on November 10, with their second full studio album. On November 1, Jellyfish released individual image teasers on VIXX's official Facebook and Twitter and a group image teaser on their official website along with the upcoming title, Chained Up. On November 10, VIXX's second studio album Chained Up was released along with the music video for "Chained Up". On November 30, Jellyfish] and CJ Victor Entertainment revealed that VIXX will be releasing their first original full-length Japanese studio album, Depend on Me, on January 27, 2016. On December 15, 2015, Jellyfish released their Jelly Christmas 2015 – 4랑 single album featuring the song, "Love in the Air" (Korean: 사랑난로). The announced participating the Jellyfish artists were Seo In-guk, VIXX, former Jewelry member Park Jung-ah and Park Yoon-ha.

=== 2016: Depend on Me, Conception: Zelos, Hades and Kratos ===
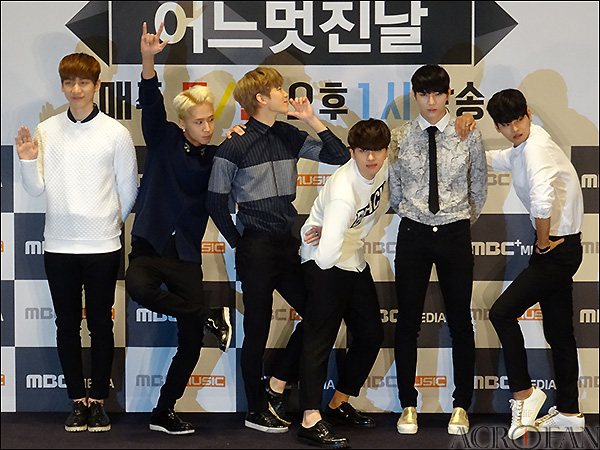
VIXX at their One Fine Day Press Conference (2015)

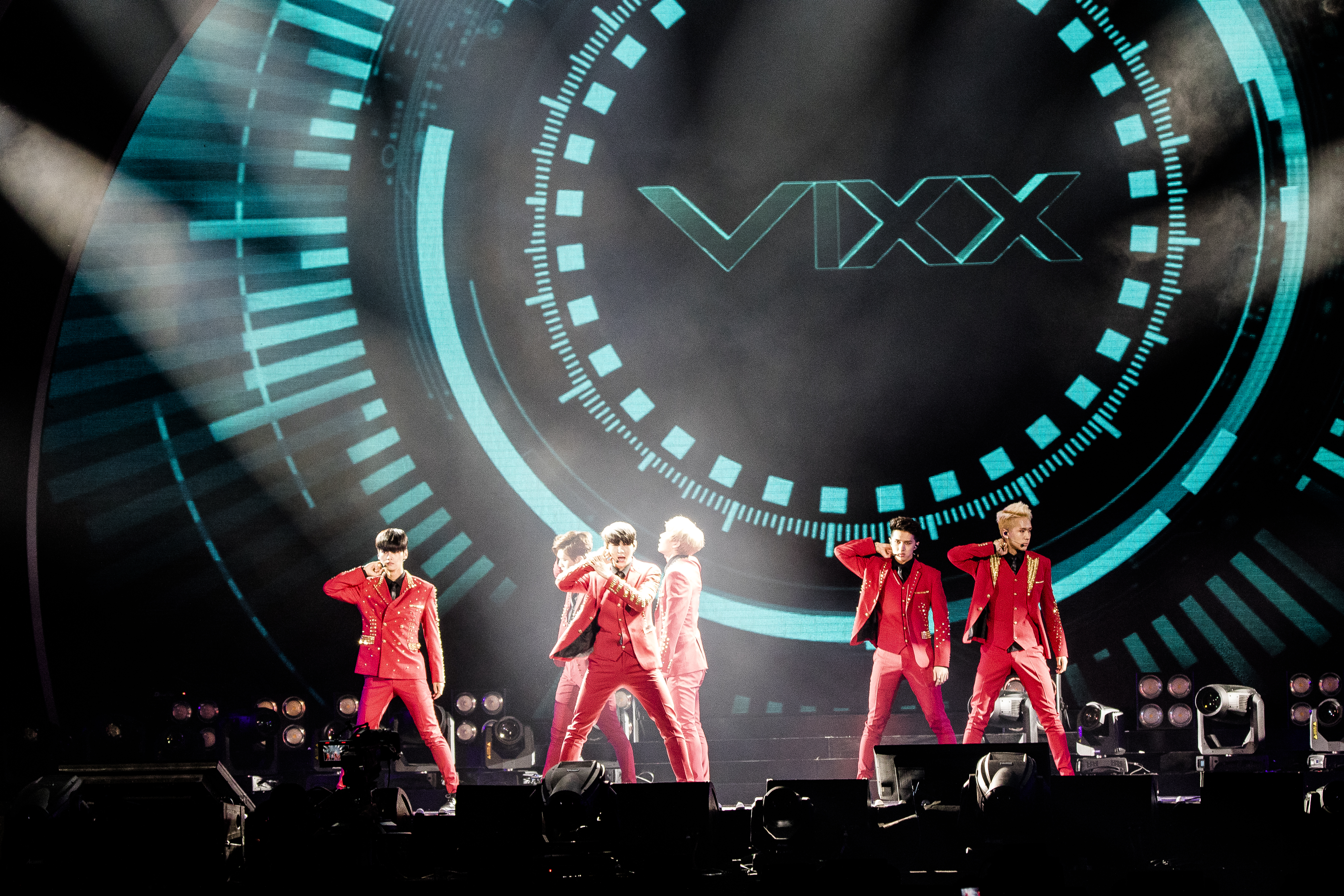
VIXX performing at the KKBOX Music Awards in Taipei, Taiwan (2015)

On January 7, 2016, Jellyfish and Victor revealed the jacket photographs which will be used for all three editions of VIXX's first Japanese studio album Depend on Me, and released a teaser to the music video. On January 18, VIXX released their first original soundtrack recording for the fantasy action-romance drama Moorim School: Saga of the Brave with the song "Alive", the drama's main theme song, released in Moorim School: Saga of the Brave OST Part. 1. Viewers of the drama have shown positive responses to the refreshingly edgy theme song. It was revealed that VIXX hoped to express their support for Hongbin's first drama lead role as the troublemaker Wang Chi-ang by contributing to the soundtrack. On the same day, the short version of VIXX's first Japanese album Depend on Me's lead single's music video was released in Japan. On January 27, VIXX's first Japanese studio album, Depend on Me, was released which features the single "Depend on Me" and previously released Japanese singles "Error" and "Can't Say". On the same day of the release, Depend on Me charted at number 4 on the Oricon daily album chart. To promote the album VIXX held "Mini Live & High Touch" events in Sapporo, Kobe, Tokyo, Osaka and Fukuoka from January 13 to 31, 2016. On February 1, 2016, Moorim School: Saga of the Brave OST Part. 2 was released with the title song "The King" by VIXX.

On March 29, 2016, Jellyfish Entertainment released the Conception Art Film, which was said to signal the start of their year-long project VIXX 2016 Conception, through which the group would show their wide musical and conceptual spectrum and would be themed around the gods that appear in Greek mythology.

On April 14, 2016, the group revealed the Zelos Concept Film, along with the release of the track list and highlight medley. On April 19, 2016, the group released their fifth single album, Zelos, along with the title track "Dynamite" (Korean: 다이너마이트). The music video for "Dynamite" was released on the following day. In April and May VIXX won 1st place five times on the music shows and achieved their second Triple Crown on The Show. Zelos charted at number 1 on the Gaon album chart selling cumulative 89,910 copies in April, with the title song "Dynamite" charting at number 14 on the Gaon Digital Chart and number 4 on Billboard World Digital Songs.

On June 29, 2016, VIXX released their third Japanese single "Hana-Kaze" (花風). The single charted at number 3 on the Oricon Albums Chart and sold 32,411 cumulative copies.

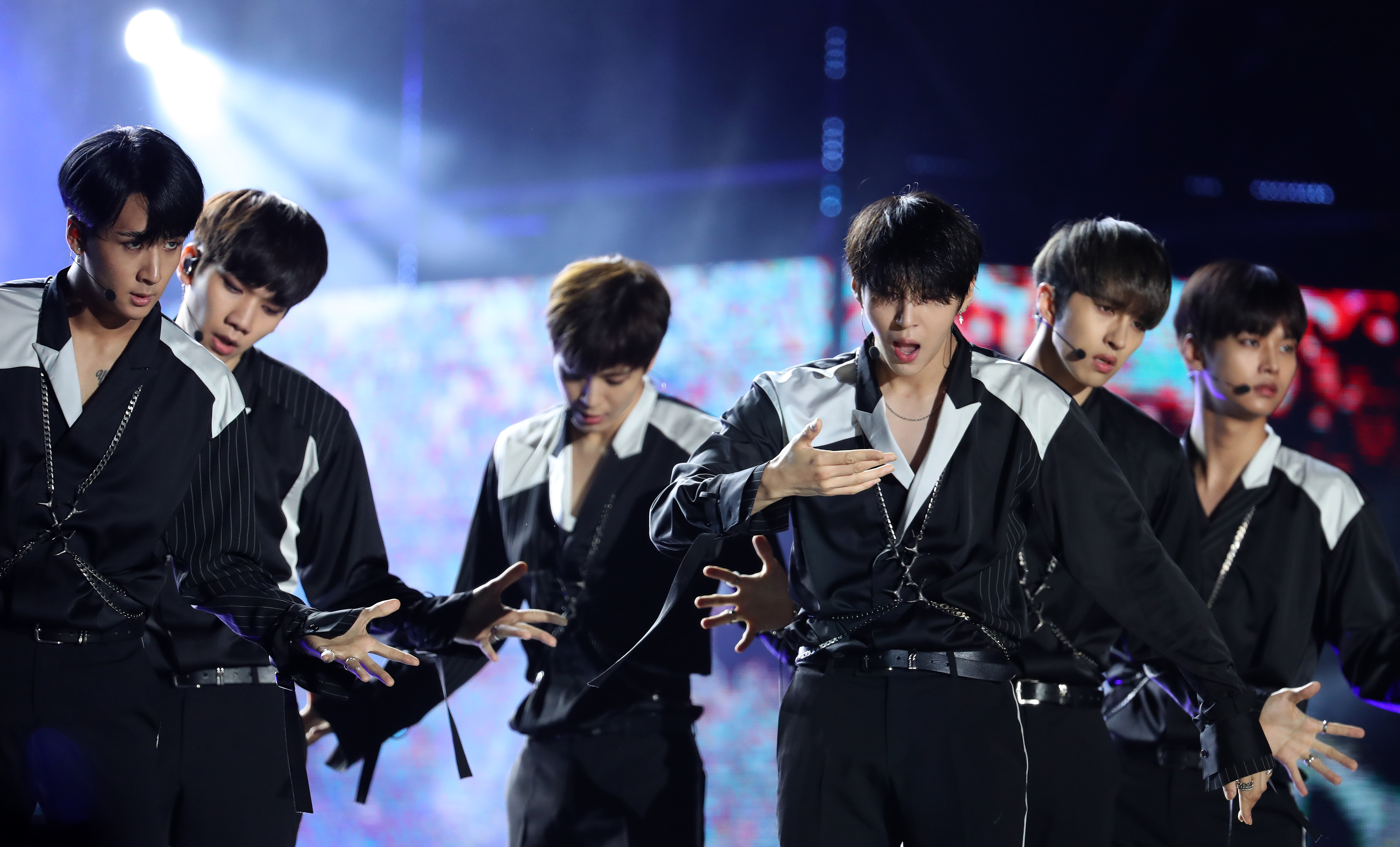
VIXX performing at Korea Sale Festa in September 2016

On August 12, 2016, VIXX released their sixth single album and the second part of their VIXX 2016 Conception trilogy, Hades, along with the title track "Fantasy". The music video for "Fantasy" was released two days later on August 14, 2016. "Fantasy" has a darker theme that emphasizes the concept of Hades, Greek god of the Underworld, unlike the first 2016 Conception release that was conceptualized around Zelos, representative of zeal and jealousy. In August and September VIXX won 1st place three times on the music shows for "Fantasy". Hades charted at number 1 on the Gaon album chart, with the title song "Fantasy" charting at number 22 on the Gaon Digital Chart and number 5 on Billboard World Digital Songs. Hades sold cumulative 97,222 copies in August.

On October 31, 2016, VIXX released their third mini album and final part and of their VIXX 2016 Conception trilogy, Kratos along with the title track "The Closer". Kratos is conceptualized around the God Kratos; the personification of strength, might, sovereign rule, and authority in all its forms. Kratos charted at number 2 on the Gaon album chart, at number 5 on Taiwan's FIVE-MUSIC Korea-Japan Album Chart and Billboard's world albums chart, with the title song "The Closer" charting at number 8 on the Gaon Digital Chart and number 14 on Billboard World Digital Songs. Kratos sold cumulative 57,456 copies in October.

On November 21, 2016, VIXX released a special compilation album to wrap up and celebrate the end of the VIXX 2016 Conception project titled VIXX 2016 Conception Ker, supported by a music video and a new song titled "Milky Way". VIXX 2016 Conception Ker charted at number 2 on the Gaon album chart and sold 18,082 cumulative copies in November.

VIXX participated in Jellyfish Entertainment's winter project, Jelly Christmas 2016, with their label mates Seo In-guk, Gugudan, Park Yoon-ha, Park Jung-ah, Kim Gyu-sun, Kim Ye-won and Jiyul. The title track, "Falling" (Korean: 니가 내려와) was released digitally on December 13, 2016.

=== 2017–2019: Shangri-La, Eau de VIXX, Reincarnation, "Walking" ===
On May 15, 2017, VIXX released their fourth mini album Shangri-La. It was a part of a three-event festival titled VIXX V Festival to celebrate their fifth anniversary since their debut. The festival began on May 12 with their VIXX Live Fantasia Daydream concert and ended with an exhibition titled VIXX 0524. Shangri-La charted at number 2 on the Gaon album chart, at number 3 on Taiwan's FIVE-MUSIC Korea-Japan Album Chart and at number 4 on Billboard's world albums chart, with the title song "Shangri-La" charting at number 13 on the Gaon Digital Chart and number 6 on Billboard World Digital Songs. Shangri-La sold cumulative 73,116 copies in May. VIXX also joined other artists at KCON 2017 in Los Angeles in mid-August showcasing titles from their album.

On September 27, 2017, VIXX released their first Japanese extended play Lalala ~ Thank you for your love ~ (ラララ ～愛をありがとう～). Upon its release the album charted at number one in the Oricon Daily CD album charts.

During the year-end music show 2017 MBC Gayo Daejun the group managed to gain major public attention with a special performance of "Wind of Starlight" and "Shangri-La Remix" by remaining the most trending video clip for over 24 hours on the TV Cast's 'Celebrity HOT Ranking' chart and their performance clip having over 3 million views as of now. Due to popular demand, they were able to perform their remix on the Show! Music Core broadcast in January 2018 again. Later it was announced, that VIXX would take part as an act in the opening ceremony of the celebratory cultural performance of the International Olympic Committee's 132nd conference in Pyeongchang on February 5 at Gangneung Art Center.

On April 17, 2018, VIXX released their third full studio album Eau de VIXX, featuring "Scentist" (Korean: 향), the lead single inspired by scents. The album charted at number 1 on the Gaon Weekly Album Chart and at number 3 on Billboard's US World albums.

On September 26, 2018, VIXX released their third full Japanese album, Reincarnation, with a total of 10 songs. The album contains songs from Eau de VIXX but also presents new songs that explore VIXX's artistry by showing a different concept of scent through the title song Reincarnation, as a personification of a flower that is destined to bloom.

On February 1, 2019, VIXX released their single "Walking" which they sang on their 5th fan meeting V TOY STORY on January 27. They wanted to thank their fans and cheer them up before the coming enlistment date of two of the members. N and Leo both began their military service later that year, N on March 19 and Leo on December 2. Leo served as a public service worker due to his panic disorder and depression.

On May 24, Leo, Ken, Hongbin, and Hyuk renewed their contracts, but Ravi decided to part ways with Jellyfish Entertainment in order to establish his own one-man label. However, Ravi intends to continue be a part of VIXX.

=== 2020–present: Hongbin and Ravi's departure, member agency changes, Continuum ===
On July 6, 2020, Ken enlisted in the South Korean military, where he joined the military band. He was discharged on January 5, 2022.

On August 7, 2020, Jellyfish Entertainment announced that Hongbin had departed from VIXX and that the group would be continuing activities as five members.

On October 7, 2020, N was officially discharged after having completed his military service. Shortly thereafter, on October 31, 2020, it was announced that N has chosen not to renew his contract with Jellyfish Entertainment, but he will continue as a part of VIXX. N officially signed with 51k on November 4.

On September 9, 2021, Leo was discharged after completing his military service.

On June 1, 2022, Hyuk announced that he would be leaving Jellyfish Entertainment, but he will continue as a part of VIXX.

Ravi started his mandatory military service on October 27, 2022, as a social worker after completing basic training. On January 12, 2023, Ravi was reported to be under investigation on suspicion of violating military law by using an illegal military exemption scheme.

In December 2022, VIXX posted a digital cover of "Gonna Be Alright" online on their official SNS account, the single has been released on January 3, 2023.

On April 11, 2023, Jellyfish Entertainment announced that Ravi had departed from VIXX following his violation on military law by using an illegal military exemption scheme.

On November 21, 2023, VIXX released a music video for their song "Amnesia", the lead single for their new mini album Continuum, which came out on the same day.

On March 3, 2024, Jellyfish Entertainment announced that Leo and Ken were leaving the agency, but intended to continue their activities with VIXX.

On March 21, 2024, Hyuk's agency Companion Company announced that he would be starting his mandatory military service as a public service worker on April 18.

On May 3, 2024, VIXX announced that their 6th Fanmeeting "VIXX St★rlight 6th Fanmeeting" will held at KBS Arena Hall from May 18 to 19.

On January 15, 2026, VIXX announced through the official SNS that they will hold a fan concert "2026 VIXX FAN CONCERT 'Case No. VIXX'" at Seoul KBS Arena on February 21 and 22.

== Artistry ==
=== Image and artistry ===
The members are heavily involved in the development of their concepts and their "commitment to concept is especially impressive with live performances of songs". Micah Levin Isla from The Philippine Star commented, "You can be someone who'll never be truly on board with this whole K-Pop craze. But there's something about VIXX that's really fascinating and intriguing. Their music and appeal have this lingering effect". VIXX has cemented a "niche in the theatrical side of K-pop" with performances that follow a storyline that is carefully put together. In a review of one of their concerts, journalist Park Jung Sun commented, "They presented live performances which broke prejudices people have towards idols. VIXX presented a musical-like stage as coming off from the-usual-concert which displays singing and dancing. VIXX led their fans to UTOPIA that they constructed".

=== Lyrics and musical style ===
With many of their releases, VIXX has tackled themes such as hope, dreams, falling madly in love with a girl although it hurts, such in the songs "On and On" (Korean: 다칠 준비가 돼 있어), which literally translates into "I'm Ready to Get Hurt", "Voodoo Doll" and "Chained Up"; breaking up with their lovers "Love Equation", "Don't Want to Be An Idol"'; generally sad or dark love songs, with the themes of obsession and insanity such as the songs "Hyde" and "G.R.8.U"; and emotional breakdown in "Error" and the timelessness of love in "Eternity". VIXX plays an active role producing their music, with all members participating in the ideas and concepts. Ravi, Leo, Hyuk and most recently N and Ken play an active role in composition and lyric-writing of their songs.

== Discography ==
Korean albums

- Voodoo (2013)
- Chained Up (2015)
- Eau de VIXX (2018)

Japanese albums

- Depend on Me (2016)
- Reincarnation (2018)

== Filmography ==
Reality TV Shows

- VIXX TV (2012–present; YouTube)
- MyDOL (2012; Mnet)
- VIXX's MTV Diary (2012; SBS MTV)
- Plan V Diary (2013; SBS MTV)
- VIXX File (2013; Mnet Japan)
- VIXX's One Fine Day (2015; MBC Music)
- Project VIXX ~Invaders from Space~ (2016; Fuji TV NEXT)
- Project VIXX 2 ~Invaders from Space Return~ (2016; Fuji TV NEXT)
- ASIA LOVED BY VIXX (2017; skyTravel)
- Project VIXX 3 ~Invaders from Space~ (2017; Fuji TV NEXT)
- Project VIXX 4 ~Invaders from Space~ (2017; Fuji TV NEXT)
- Today is the Best (2019; U+ Idol Live)

== Concerts and tours ==
=== Headlining ===
==== Main Tours ====
- VIXX Global Showcase - The Milky Way (2013)
- VIXX Live Fantasia – HEX SIGN (2014)
- VIXX Live Fantasia – UTOPIA (2015)
- VIXX Live Fantasia – ELYSIUM (2016)
- VIXX Live Fantasia – 백일몽 (Daydream) (2017)
- VIXX Live Fantasia - Lost Fantasia (2018)
- VIXX Live Fantasia - Parallel (2019)
- VIXX Live Fantasia - Continuum (2023)
- VIXX Fan Concert - Case No. VIXX (2026)

==== Japan Tour ====
- VIXX Japan Live Tour - Depend On (2016)

==== Co-headlining ====
- Jellyfish Live (2012)
- Y.Bird from Jellyfish Island Showcase (2013)

== Other ventures ==
=== Philanthropy ===
In 2012, VIXX became the Goodwill Ambassadors for The Salvation Army as a part of the 2012 Salvation Army Christmas Kettle, with December 14, 2012 as their Kettle Day—a date which was chosen by fans.

In November 2013, VIXX along with Boys Republic became ambassadors for "Eye Camp Expedition", a charity campaign, joining other volunteers in Vietnam to help those visually impaired. Their charity work was documented through a four episodes reality show aired on SBS MTV. In 2014, VIXX became the official ambassadors at the Korea & Korean brand Commodities Fair (KBEE) in São Paulo, Brazil.

In 2015, VIXX helped Daehwan, a fan of the group who had muscular dystrophy, to see the VIXX Live Fantasia – Utopia concert after Daehwan's mother started a Twitter account and tweeted to VIXX. Enough money was donated to the fund to allow Daehwan travel to and from the concert venue safely, and provided a bed for him to lie upon. Daehwan met with VIXX after the concert.

=== Sports events ===
In the course of the national preparations for 2018 Winter Olympics, on September 12, 2017, N announced on his personal Instagram account his selection as torchbearer followed by Leo on October 8, 2017. Leo made his torchbearer run on January 13, 2018, whereas N's turn came on January 15, 2018.

== Sub-unit ==
VIXX LR (Korean: 빅스 LR) is the first official sub-unit of VIXX formed under Jellyfish Entertainment. Established in August 2015, the sub-unit comprises vocalist Leo and rapper Ravi. The duo debuted with their first mini album, Beautiful Liar, on August 17, 2015. VIXX LR released their second mini album Whisper on August 28, 2017.
