= Chained Up =

- Control Version

Studio album by VIXX
- Released: November 10, 2015
- Recorded: 2014–2015
- Genre: K-pop; dance-pop; ballad
- Length: 44:00
- Language: Korean
- Label: Jellyfish Entertainment; CJ E&M Music

VIXX chronology
Boys' Record (2015)	Chained Up (2015)	Depend on Me (2016)

Alternative Cover
- Freedom Version

Singles from Chained Up
- 1. "Chained Up" Released: November 10, 2015; 2. "Chained Up" Released: November 25, 2015 (Chinese Version)

Chained Up is the second studio album by the South Korean boy band VIXX. It was released on November 10, 2015, under the label of Jellyfish Entertainment. It features the single "Chained Up".

== Background and promotions ==
In late October Jellyfish Entertainment announced that VIXX would be having a comeback on November 10, with their second full studio album. On November 1, Jellyfish Entertainment released on VIXX's official Facebook and Twitter individual image teasers and a group image teaser on their official website along with the upcoming title, Chained Up. On November 2, Jellyfish Entertainment started a Hidden Key Game on Facebook and Twitter in which in order to find hidden image teasers relating to Chained Up on VIXX's official website.

On November 10, VIXX's second studio album Chained Up was released along with the music video for “Chained Up”. On the same day VIXX held a showcase for Chained Up at AX Korea in Seoul’s Gwangjin-gu. Upon the release of Chained Up, the title song was ranked number one on Mnet, Genie, Monkey3 and Naver Music, whilst the remaining songs also ranked taking over the charts. VIXX started their promotions for “Chained Up” on Music Bank on November 13. On November 17, VIXX gained their first win for "Chained Up" on The Show. On the 19th of November Chained Up debuted at number three on the Billboard World Albums Chart. On December 4, 2015, VIXX wrapped up their promotional cycle for Chained Up on Music Bank with a goodbye stage performance.

=== Showcase Tour ===
Date	Venue	Location	Country
November 10, 2015	AX Korea	Gwangjin-gu, Seoul	South Korea
December 8, 2015		Beijing	China
December 13, 2015		Shanghai	China

== Track listing ==
The credits are adapted from the official homepage of the group.

No.	Title	Lyrics	Music	Length
1.	"Mistress" (Intro)		MELODESIGN	1:11
2.	"Chained Up" (사슬; Saseul)	Misfit, Ravi	Albi Albertsson, Hugo Solis, Farah Achour, Carl Arvid Lehne	3:13
3.	"Maze"	Misfit, Ravi	Albi Albertsson, Martin Mulholland, Nalle Ahlesdt	3:28
4.	"Stop It Girl"	Kim Ji-hyang, Ravi	Erik Lidbom, Andreas Oberg	3:45
5.	"Hot Enough"	Kim Min-jin, Ravi	Erik Lidbom, MLC, Deeepsol, Odd.I	3:27
6.	"Spider"	Park Sung-hee (Jam Factory), Ravi	Simon Janlöv	3:47
7.	"Out of Sorts" (부시시; Busisi)	Kim Ji-hyang, Ravi	MELODESIGN	3:55
8.	"Heaven"	Ravi	Ravi	3:15
9.	"Us Now" (지금 우린; Jigeum Ulin)	Kim Ji-hyang	MELODESIGN	4:24
10.	"Eternity" (기적; Gijeok)	Kim Eana	Hyuk Shin, Deanfluenza, 2xxx!, DK, siyeonking!	3:04
11.	"Error"	Kim Eana	Hwang Se-jun, MELODESIGN	3:46
12.	"Can't Say"	Kim Ji-hyang, Ravi (Original Lyrics by SHOW for Digz. Inc Group)	Hwang Se-jun (Y.Bird), MELODESIGN	3:24
13.	"Chained Up" (Inst.)		Albi Albertsson, Hugo Solis, Farah Achour, Carl Arvid Lehne	3:13
Total length:				44:00

== Chart performance ==
Chart	Peak position	Sales
South Korea (Gaon Weekly albums chart)	1	KOR: 120,158
South Korea (Gaon Weekly social chart)	1	KOR: 120,158
South Korea (Gaon Weekly singles chart)	8	KOR: 120,158
Taiwan (Five-Music) (Korea-Japan Weekly album chart)	1	KOR: 120,158
US World (Weekly world albums chart)	3	KOR: 120,158

== Awards and nominations ==
=== Awards ===
Year	Award	Category	Recipient	Result
2015	MBC Show Champion Awards	Best Performance	"Chained Up"	Nominated
2015	SBS PopAsia Awards	Best Song of The Year	"Chained Up"	Nominated
2015	KMC Radio Awards	Comeback of the Year	"Chained Up"	Won
2015	KMC Radio Awards	Album of the Year	Chained Up	Nominated
2016	Seoul Music Awards	Bonsang Award	Chained Up	Won
2016	YinYueTai V Chart Awards	Best Performance	"Chained Up"	Won
2017	Golden Disk Awards	Disk Bonsang Award	Chained Up	Won

=== Music program awards ===
Song	Music show	Date
"Chained Up"	The Show	November 17, 2015
"Chained Up"	Show Champion	November 18, 2015
"Chained Up"	Music Bank	November 20, 2015

== Release history ==
Region	Date	Format	Label
Korean album
South Korea	November 10, 2015	CD; Digital download	Jellyfish Entertainment; CJ E&M Music
Worldwide	November 10, 2015	Digital download	Jellyfish Entertainment
Chinese single
China	November 25, 2015	Digital download	Jellyfish Entertainment, QQ
Taiwan	November 25, 2015	Digital download	Jellyfish Entertainment, Avex Taiwan

== See also ==
- List of K-pop albums on the Billboard charts
- List of Gaon Album Chart number ones of 2015
