= Shangri-La (EP) =

EP by VIXX
- Released: May 15, 2017
- Genre: K-pop
- Language: Korean
- Label: Jellyfish Entertainment; CJ E&M Music

VIXX chronology
VIXX 2016 Conception Ker (2016)	Shangri-La (2017)	Lalala ~ Thank you for your love ~ (ラララ ～愛をありがとう～) (2017)

Singles from Shangri-La
- 1. "Shangri-La" Released: May 15, 2017

Shangri-La (Korean: 도원경; Hanja: 桃源境; RR: Do Won Kyung) is the fourth mini-album by the South Korean boy band VIXX. It was released on May 15, 2017, under the label of Jellyfish Entertainment. It features the single of the same name.

== Background and release ==
On March 23, 2017, Jellyfish Entertainment announced that the members of VIXX were working on their new album with a release goal set for May. On April 6, the agency revealed that as part of their 5th anniversary celebration, VIXX will be holding a concert, have an album release and an exhibition. The celebration made to be a festival titled "VIXX V FESTIVAL" would start with their VIXX Live Fantasia Daydream concert from May 12 to the 14th and their comeback song will be revealed for the first time. They'll be releasing their album right after and then hold an exhibition.

The name and date of the album was announced on May 2, under the name “Do Won Kyung", and scheduled for release May 15. On May 4, VIXX released a series of individual shots of the members along with their birth flowers followed by individual shots of the members with their birthstones on May 5.

The members and their birthstones and birth flowers
Member	Birth month	Birth flower	Birthstone
N	June	Honeysuckle	Pearl
Leo	November	Hibiscus	Topaz
Ken	April	Adonis	Diamond
Ravi	February	Cryptomeria	Amethyst
Hongbin	September	Malus pumila	Sapphire
Hyuk	July	Lavender	Ruby

On May 5, VIXX released a concept performance film featuring a solo dance performance from N on Naver TV and YouTube. On May 7, VIXX revealed the album's tracklist consisting of five songs including an instrumental track of the title song “Do Won Kyung”. It was also announced that the album would come in two versions, Birthstone and Birth Flower which both come with a CD, 68 page photobook, bookmark, postcard and a poster. The album also has a Kihno set which has the Kihno card, a postcard set, photo card set and a poster.

Shangri-La was released along with the title track's music video on May 15, 2017.

== Promotion ==
VIXX began promoting Shangri-La with live performances on KBS2's You Hee-yeol's Sketchbook music program, on May 16, 2017, followed by performances on the following music programs; Mnet's M! Countdown, SBS MTV's The Show, MBC Music's Show Champion, KBS's Music Bank, MBC's Show! Music Core and SBS's Inkigayo.

== Track listing ==
The credits are adapted from the official homepage of the group.

No.	Title	Lyrics	Music	Length
1.	"Shangri-La" (도원경/桃源境; Do Won Kyung)	Jung Il-ri, Ravi	Devine Channel	3:22
2.	"Into the Void"	Kim Soo-jung (Music Cube), 77어린이 (Music Cube), Ravi	Erik Lidbom, MLC	3:24
3.	"Black Out"	Kim Ji-hyang, Ravi	Simon Janlöv, MELODESIGN	3:09
4.	"1, 2, 3, 4, 5" (다가오네; Dagaone) (Translation: "It's Coming")	Ravi	Ravi, PUFF	3:48
5.	"To Us" (우리에게; Uliege)	Kim Ji-hyang, Ravi	MELODESIGN, Keeproots, fascinating	3:43
6.	"Shangri-La" (Inst)		Devine Channel	3:22

== Awards and nominations ==
=== Music program awards ===
Song	Music show	Date
"Shangri-La"	The Show	May 23, 2017

== Chart performance ==
Chart	Peak position	Sales
South Korea (Gaon album chart)	2	KOR: 88,900; JPN: 2,370
Japan (Oricon album chart)	37	KOR: 88,900; JPN: 2,370
Taiwan (Five-Music) Weekly album chart	3	KOR: 88,900; JPN: 2,370
Billboard (US Heatseekers)	13	KOR: 88,900; JPN: 2,370
Billboard (US World)	4	KOR: 88,900; JPN: 2,370

== Release history ==
Region	Date	Format	Label
South Korea	May 15, 2017	CD; Digital download	Jellyfish Entertainment; CJ E&M
Worldwide	May 15, 2017	Digital download	Jellyfish Entertainment

== See also ==
- List of K-pop albums on the Billboard charts
