= Error (VIXX EP) =

EP by VIXX
- Released: October 14, 2014
- Recorded: 2014
- Genre: K-pop
- Length: 22:00
- Language: Korean
- Label: Jellyfish Entertainment

VIXX chronology
Darkest Angels (2014)	Error (2014)	Boys' Record (2015)

Alternative cover
- Japanese single cover

Singles from Error
- 1. "Error" Released: October 14, 2014; 2. "Error -Japanese Ver.-" Released: December 10, 2014; 3. "Error -Chinese Ver.-" Released: July 7, 2015

Error is the second mini-album by the South Korean boy band VIXX. It was released on October 14, 2014 under the label of Jellyfish Entertainment. It features the single of the same name. The song, along with its music video was also released in Japan in Japanese under CJ Victor Entertainment as their Japanese debut. The song was then finally released in China and Taiwan in Chinese through QQ and in Taiwan through KKBOX.

== Promotion ==
VIXX began promoting this album on MBC M's Show Champion on October 15, 2014. "Error" won five music program awards, one each on Show Champion, Music Bank and Inkigayo, and two on The Show.

== Composition ==
"Error" was written by lyricist Kim Eana, Jellyfish CEO Hwang Se-jun and in house producers MELODESIGN. The song's music video was directed by Hong Won-ki of ZanyBros, who directed most of their previous music videos. The music video features Heo Youngji from Kara as Cyborg Girl.

== Track listing ==
The credits are adapted from the official homepage of the group.

Error - Korean EP
No.	Title	Lyrics	Music	Length
1.	"Steel Heart" (Intro)		MELODESIGN, Lee Seul-gi	00:46
2.	"Error"	Kim Eana	Hwang Se-jun, MELODESIGN	03:46
3.	"After Dark"	Ryu Dasom (Jam Factory), Ravi	Andrew Choi, 220, Jake K, Hayley Aitken	03:08
4.	"Blue Blossom" (청춘이 아파; Cheongchuni Apa) (Translation: "Youth Hurts")	Kim Ji-hyang, Ravi	MELODESIGN	03:41
5.	"Time Machine"	1월 8일 (Jam Factory), Ravi	Albi Albertsson	03:05
6.	"What U Waiting For"	Ravi	Ravi	03:11
7.	"Error" (Inst.)		Hwang Se-jun, MELODESIGN	03:46
Total length:				22:00

== Japanese single ==
On December 10, 2014, VIXX marked their first official entry into the Japanese market with the release of the Japanese version of "Error" in a single album, which also included the Japanese version of "Youth Hurts" under the Japanese title of "Seishun datte" (Japanese: 青春だって) from their Korean language mini-album, Error. The single peaked at number 6 on the Oricon charts and sold over 19,381 CD copies.

Error - Japanese single
No.	Title	Lyrics	Music	Length
1.	"Error" (Japanese Ver)	Kim Eana (Japanese Lyrics by SHOW for Digz. Inc Group)	Hwang Se-jun, MELODESIGN	03:48
2.	"青春だって" (Seishun datte) (Translation: "Youth Hurts")	Kim Ji-hyang, Ravi (Japanese lyrics: SHOW for Digz, Inc. Group)	MELODESIGN	03:41
3.	"Error" (Inst.)		Hwang Se-jun, MELODESIGN	03:48
4.	"青春だって" (Inst.)		MELODESIGN	03:41

Japanese DVD
No.	Title	Length
1.	"Error" (Japanese Ver. Music Video)
2.	"Error" (Japanese Ver. Music Video Making Film)

== Chart performance ==
Chart	Peak position	Sales
Gaon Weekly albums chart	1	KOR: 93,239
Gaon Monthly albums chart	2	KOR: 93,239

== Awards and nominations ==
=== Awards ===
Year	Award	Category	Recipient	Result
2014	SBS MTV Best of the Best	Best Music Video	Error	Nominated
2014	Seoul Music Awards	Bonsang Award	Error	Won
2014	SBS PopAsia Awards	Best Song of the Year	Error	Nominated
2014	KMC Radio Awards	Best Music Video	Error	Nominated
2014	KMC Radio Awards	Best Song of the Year	Error	Nominated
2015	Seoul Music Awards	Bonsang Award	Error	Won
2015	Gaon Chart Music Awards	4th Quarter Best Selling Record Award	Error	Nominated
2016	Golden Disk Awards	Disk Bonsang Award	Error	Won

=== Music program awards ===
Song	Music show	Date
"Error"	Show Champion	October 22, 2014
"Error"	Music Bank	October 24, 2014
"Error"	Inkigayo	October 26, 2014
"Error"	The Show	October 28, 2014
"Error"	The Show	November 4, 2014

== Release history ==
Region	Date	Format	Label
Korean album
South Korea	October 14, 2014	CD; Digital download	Jellyfish Entertainment; CJ E&M Music
Worldwide	October 14, 2014	Digital download	Jellyfish Entertainment
Japanese single
Japan	December 10, 2014	CD, CD+DVD	Jellyfish Entertainment, CJ Victor Entertainment
Chinese single
China	July 7, 2015	Digital download	Jellyfish Entertainment, QQ
Taiwan	July 7, 2015	Digital download	Jellyfish Entertainment, Avex Taiwan

== See also ==
- List of Gaon Album Chart number ones of 2014
- List of K-pop albums on the Billboard charts
