= Jellyfish Entertainment discography =

This is a list of albums released under the Jellyfish Entertainment record label from 2007 and after.

PROJECT ALBUM Color key

- Jelly Christmas - Special winter collaboration singles by Jellyfish artists
- Y.Bird from Jellyfish Island
- Jelly Box - music channel singles

== 2000s ==
=== 2007 ===
Released	Title	Artist	Language	Type	Format
October 19	Parting Once Again (한번 더 이별)	Sung Si-kyung	Korean	Digital single	Digital download

=== 2008 ===
Released	Title	Artist	Language	Type	Format
June 12	Here In My Heart (여기 내 맘속에)	Sung Si-kyung	Korean	Studio album	Unknown
August 14	Vitamin (비타민)	Park Hak-ki	Korean	Digital single	Digital download
November 20	Vol.1 Welcome To The Fantastic World (Feat. Park Hyo-shin)	Hwang Project	Korean	Mini album (EP)	Digital download
November 24	Here In My Heart (*Special Edition)	Sung Si-kyung	Korean	Studio album	Unknown

=== 2009 ===
Released	Title	Artist	Language	Type	Format
April 23	Polaroid	Kim Hyeong-jung	Korean	Studio album	Unknown
September 15	Gift Part 1	Park Hyo-shin	Korean	Studio album	CD, digital download
October 27	(부른다) (Calling)	Seo In-guk	Korean	Single album	CD, digital download
October 30	(달려와) (Run to Me)	Seo In-guk	Korean	Digital single	Digital download

== 2010s ==
=== 2010 ===
Released	Title	Artist	Language	Type	Format
January 5	Should we Marry? (우리 결혼할까)	Lisa	Korean	Digital single	Digital download
May 6	Just Beginning	Seo In-guk	Korean	Mini album (EP)	CD, digital download
August 10	애기야 (Aegiya)	Seo In-guk	Korean	Repackaged album	Unknown
September 28	It's You (그대네요)	Sung Si-kyung	Korean	Digital single	Digital download
November 22	Take	Seo In-guk	Korean	Digital single	Digital download
December 6	Jelly Christmas	Sung Si-kyung, Park Hyo-shin, Seo In-guk, Brian Joo, Lisa, Park Hak-ki, Kim Hyeong-jung, and Kyun Woo	Korean	Digital single	Digital download
December 13	Gift Part 2	Park Hyo-shin	Korean	Studio album	CD, digital download

=== 2011 ===
Released	Title	Artist	Language	Type	Format
March 31	Broken	Seo In-guk	Korean	Digital single	Digital download
April 7	UNVEILED	Brian Joo	Korean and English	Mini Album (EP)	CD, Digital download
August 10	Shake it up	Seo In-guk	Korean	Digital single	Digital download
September 15	The First (처음)	Sung Si-kyung	Korean	Studio album	CD, digital Download
December 2	Jelly Christmas 2011	Sung Si-kyung, Brian Joo, Seo In-guk, Park Hak-ki, Park Jang-hyun, and Hwang Project	Korean	Digital single	Digital download

=== 2012 ===
Released	Title	Artist	Language	Type	Format
January 26	Reborn Part 1	Brian Joo	Korean and English	Studio album	Unknown
March 22	Gift E.C.H.O	Park Hyo-shin	Korean	Special album	CD, digital download
April 12	Perfect Fit	Seo In-guk	Korean	Mini album (EP)	Unknown
May 24	Super Hero	VIXX	Korean	Single	CD, Digital download
June 14	Y.Bird from Jellyfish Island with Lee Seok Hoon	Lee Seok-hoon	Korean	Single	Digital download
August 14	Rock Ur Body	VIXX	Korean	Single	CD, Digital download
December 6	Jelly Christmas 2012 Heart Project	Sung Si-kyung, Park Hyo-shin, Lee Seok-hoon, Seo In-guk, and VIXX	Korean	Single	Digital download

=== 2013 ===
Released	Title	Artist	Language	Type	Format
January 17	On and On	VIXX	Korean	Single	CD, digital download
February 4	Y.BIRD from Jellyfish Island With Seo In Guk	Seo In-guk	Korean	Single	Digital download
April 12	With Laughter or with Tears	Seo In-guk	Korean	Single	Digital download
May 20	Hyde	VIXX	Korean	Mini album (EP)	CD, digital download
July 31	Jekyll (Hyde Repackage)	VIXX	Korean	Mini album (EP)	CD, digital download
October 11	Y.BIRD from Jellyfish Island With VIXX & OKDAL	VIXX and OKDAL	Korean	Digital single	Digital download
November 8	Only U	VIXX	Korean	Pre-release single	Digital download
November 25	Voodoo	VIXX	Korean	Studio album	CD, digital download
December 12	겨울 고백 (Jelly Christmas 2013)	VIXX, Sung Si-kyung, Park Hyo-shin, Seo In-guk, and Little Sister	Korean	Digital single	Digital download

=== 2014 ===
Released	Title	Artist	Language	Type	Format
March 28	Wildflower	Park Hyo-shin	Korean	Single	Digital download
May 14	Bomtanaba (Mellow Spring)	Seo In-guk	Korean	Single	Digital download
May 27	Eternity	VIXX	Korean	Single	CD, digital download
July 2	Darkest Angels	VIXX	Korean	Compilation album	CD, digital download
August 5	Y.BIRD from Jellyfish with LYn X Leo	Leo and LYn	Korean	Digital single	Digital download
October 14	Error	VIXX	Korean	Mini album (EP)	CD, digital download
November 24	HAPPY TOGETHER	Park Hyo-shin	Korean	Digital single	Digital download
December 8	Winter Wonderland	Sung Si-kyung	Korean	Remake album	Unknown
December 10	Error	VIXX	Japanese	Single	CD+DVD, digital download

=== 2015 ===
Released	Title	Artist	Language	Type	Format
February 24	Boys' Record	VIXX	Korean	Special single album	CD, digital download
April 6	Shine Your Light	Park Hyo-shin	Korean	Single	Digital download
June 24	Gap	Ken and Hani	Korean	Single	Digital download
July 7	Error	VIXX	Chinese	Single	Digital download
August 17	Beautiful Liar	VIXX LR	Korean	Mini album (EP)	CD, digital download
September 9	Can't Say	VIXX	Japanese	Single	CD+DVD, digital download
November 10	Chained Up	VIXX	Korean	Studio album	CD, digital download
November 25	Chained Up	VIXX	Chinese	Digital single	Digital download
December 15	Jelly Christmas 2015 – 4랑	Seo In-guk, VIXX, Park Jung-ah, and Park Yoon-ha	Korean	Digital single	Digital download

=== 2016 ===
Released	Title	Artist	Language	Type	Format
January 27	Depend on Me	VIXX	Japanese	Studio album	CD+DVD, digital download
March 8	Seasons of the Heart	Seo In-guk	Korean	Digital single	Digital download
March 12	[R.EBIRTH]	Ravi	Korean	Mixtape	Streamed audio
April 19	Zelos	VIXX	Korean	Single album	CD, digital download
June 8	Summer Night's Picnic (여름밤피크닉)	Park Yoon-ha x Yoo Seung-woo	Korean	Single album	Digital download
June 28	Act. 1 The Little Mermaid	Gugudan	Korean	Mini album (EP)	CD, digital download
June 29	Hana-Kaze (花風)	VIXX	Japanese	Single	CD+DVD, digital download
July 14	DamnRa (Feat. SAM&SP3CK)	Ravi	Korean	Single	Digital download
August 12	Hades	VIXX	Korean	Single	CD, digital download
October 31	Kratos	VIXX	Korean	Mini album (EP)	CD, digital download
November 21	VIXX 2016 Conception Ker	VIXX	Korean	Compilation album	CD+DVD, Digital download
November 23	Flower Way (꽃길)	Sejeong	Korean	Digital single	Digital download
December 13	Jelly Christmas 2016	Seo In-guk, VIXX, Gugudan, Park Yoon-ha, Park Jung-ah, Kim Gyu-sun, Kim Ye-won, and Jiyul	Korean	Digital single	Digital download
December 28	BeBe	Seo In-guk	Korean	Digital single	Digital download

=== 2017 ===
Released	Title	Artist	Language	Type	Format
January 4	Home Alone (ft. Jung Yong-hwa)	Ravi	Korean	Pre-release single	Digital download
January 9	R.eal1ze	Ravi	Korean	Mini album (EP)	CD, digital download
February 27	Act. 2 Narcissus	Gugudan	Korean	Mini album (EP)	CD, digital download
March 27	Walk Together	Seo In-guk	Korean	Digital single	Digital download
May 15	Shangri-La	VIXX	Korean	Mini album (EP)	CD, digital download
August 10	Ice Chu	Gugudan 5959	Korean	Digital single	Digital download
August 28	Whisper	VIXX LR	Korean	Mini album (EP)	CD, digital download
September 27	Lalala ~ Thank you for your love ~ (ラララ ～愛をありがとう～)	VIXX	Japanese	Mini album (EP)	CD, digital download
October 31	나의 밤 나의 너	Sung Si-kyung	Korean	Single	Digital download
November 8	Act. 3 Chococo Factory	Gugudan	Korean	Single	CD, digital download

=== 2018 ===
Released	Title	Artist	Language	Type	Format
January 5	R.ebirth 2016	Ravi	Korean	Mixtape	Digital download
January 22	Nirvana	Ravi	Korean	Mixtape	Digital download
January 24	Complete LR	VIXX LR	Korean and Japanese	Compilation album	CD, digital download
February 1	Act. 4 Cait Sith	Gugudan	Korean	Single album	CD, digital download
April 17	Eau de VIXX	VIXX	Korean	Studio album	CD, digital download
June 26	K1TCHEN	Ravi	Korean	Mixtape	Digital download
July 10	SeMiNa	Gugudan SeMiNa	Korean	Single album	CD, digital download
July 31	Canvas	Leo	Korean	Mini album (EP)	CD, digital download
September 19	Stand By	Gugudan	Japanese	Compilation album	CD, digital download
September 26	Reincarnation	VIXX	Japanese	Studio album	CD, digital download
November 6	Act. 5 New Action	Gugudan	Korean	Mini album (EP)	CD, digital download

=== 2019 ===
Released	Title	Artist	Language	Type	Format
January 9	Veri-Us	Verivery	Korean	Mini album (EP)	CD, digital download
March 3	R.OOK BOOK	Ravi	Korean	Mini album (EP)	CD, digital download
April 24	Veri-Able	Verivery	Korean	Mini album (EP)	CD, digital download
June 17	Muse	Leo	Korean	Mini album (EP)	CD, digital download
July 31	Veri-Chill	Verivery	Korean	Single album	CD, digital download
December 1	December, The Night of Dreams	Leo	Korean	Digital single	Digital download
December 18	Winter Butterfly (겨울나비)	Hyuk	Korean	Mini album (EP)	CD, digital download

== 2020s ==
=== 2020 ===
Released	Title	Artist	Language	Type	Format
January 7	Face Me	Verivery	Korean	Mini album (EP)	CD, digital download
March 17	Plant	Sejeong	Korean	Mini album (EP)	CD, digital download
May 20	Greeting	Ken	Korean	Mini album (EP)	CD, digital download
July 1	Face You	Verivery	Korean	Mini album (EP)	CD, digital download
August 17	Whale	Sejeong	Korean	Digital single	Digital download
October 13	Face Us	Verivery	Korean	Mini album (EP)	CD, digital download

=== 2021 ===
Released	Title	Artist	Language	Type	Format
March 3	Series 'O' Round 1: Hall	Verivery	Korean	Single album	CD, digital download
March 29	I'm	Sejeong	Korean	Mini album (EP)	CD, digital download
July 23	Baby I Love U	Sejeong	Korean	Digital single	Digital download
August 23	Series 'O' Round 2: Hole	Verivery	Korean	Mini album (EP)	CD, digital download
November 2	I'm Still Here	Leo	Korean	Digital single	Digital download

=== 2022 ===
Released	Title	Artist	Language	Type	Format
March 23	Series 'O' Round 0: Who	Verivery	Korean	Digital single	Digital download
April 25	Series 'O' Round 3: Whole	Verivery	Korean	Studio album	CD, digital download
June 22	Undercover (Japanese ver.)	Verivery	Japanese	Single	CD, digital download
November 15	Liminality – EP. LOVE	Verivery	Korean	Single	CD, digital download
March 22	Tap Tap (Japanese ver.)	Verivery	Japanese	Single	CD, digital download

=== 2023 ===
Released	Title	Artist	Language	Type	Format
May 16	Liminality – EP. DREAM	Verivery	Korean	Mini album (EP)	CD, digital download
September 4	문(門)(Door)	Sejeong	Korean	Full album	CD, digital download
September 19	Target: ME	Evnne	Korean	Mini album (EP)	CD, digital download

== Charted singles ==
List of charted singles from Jellyfish Entertainment's project albums, with selected chart positions, showing year released and album name
Title	Year	Artist(s)	Peak chart positions	Sales (DL)	Album
Title	Year	Artist(s)	KOR Gaon	Sales (DL)	Album
"Christmas Time"	2010	Sung Si Kyung, Park Hyo-shin, Seo In-guk, Brian Joo, Lisa, Park Hak-ki, Kim Hyeong-jung and Kyun Woo	25	—N/a	Jelly Christmas
"Christmas for All" (모두에게 크리스마스)	2011	Sung Si Kyung, Brian Joo, Seo In-guk, Park Hak-ki, Park Jang-hyun and Hwang Project	27	KOR: 407,544+	Jelly Christmas 2011
"The Beginning of Love"	2012	Lee Seok-hoon	32	KOR: 265,043+	Y.Bird from Jellyfish Island with Lee Seok Hoon
"Because It's Christmas" (크리스마스니까)	2012	Sung Si-kyung, Park Hyo-shin, Lee Seok-hoon, Seo In-guk and VIXX	1	KOR: 946,388+	Jelly Christmas 2012 Heart Project
"I Can't Live Because of You"	2013	Seo In-guk (feat. Verbal Jint)	4	KOR: 756,079+	Y.BIRD from Jellyfish Island With Seo In Guk
"Girls, Why?" (여자는 왜?)	2013	VIXX and OKDAL	57	KOR: 74,225+	Y.BIRD from Jellyfish Island With VIXX & OKDAL
"Winter Confession" (겨울고백)	2013	VIXX, Sung Si-kyung, Park Hyo-shin, Seo In-guk and Little Sister	1	KOR: 649,150+	겨울 고백 (Jelly Christmas 2013)
"Blossom Tears" (꽃잎놀이)	2014	Leo and LYn	11	KOR: 156,798+	Y.BIRD from Jellyfish with LYn X Leo
"Love In The Air" (사랑난로)	2015	Seo In-guk, VIXX, Park Jung-ah and Park Yoon-ha	14	KOR: 118,386+	Jelly Christmas 2015 – 4랑
"Summer Night's Picnic" (여름밤피크닉)	2016	Park Yoon-ha and Yoo Seung-woo	—	—N/a	Non-album singles
"DamnRa"	2016	Ravi (Feat. SAM&SP3CK)	—	—N/a	Non-album singles
"Flower Way" (꽃길)	2016	Sejeong (Prod. By Zico)	2	KOR: 536,238+	Non-album singles
"Falling" (니가 내려와)	2016	Seo In-guk, VIXX, Gugudan, Park Yoon-ha, Park Jung-ah, Kim Gyu-sun, Kim Ye-won, Jiyul	34	KOR: 52,439+	Jelly Christmas 2016
"—" denotes releases that did not chart or were not released in that region.
