= VIXX videography =

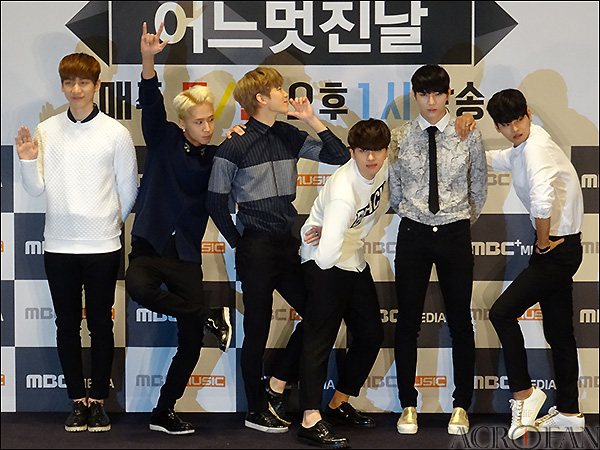
VIXX at their One Fine Day Press Conference in 2015. Left to Right: Hyuk, Ravi, Hongbin, Ken, Leo and N.

This is the videography of the South Korean boy band VIXX and their sub-unit VIXX LR, formed by Jellyfish Entertainment. Their notable group activities are listed below, as a whole, VIXX and VIXX LR has released a total of seventeen music videos, two video albums, and two seasons of a YouTube reality series titled VIXX TV.

== Web series ==
=== VIXX TV ===
VIXX TV is an ongoing YouTube reality series that provides a different view of the members as they go about various activities, often showing a more lighthearted side of VIXX off stage, while also supplying fans and viewers with news and information about them. The episodes are uploaded onto the official VIXX YouTube Channel and include English subtitles. The first season of VIXX TV (stylized as VIXX TV1) consists of one hundred episodes that vary in length. The season ran from June 16, 2012 to May 27, 2014. The second season of VIXX TV (stylized as VIXX TV2) consists of 101 episodes that vary in length. The season began on September 17, 2014 and ended on May 3, 2019. The third season of VIXX TV (stylized as VIXX TV3) began from June 9, 2019 and is still ongoing, with episodes that vary in length.

== Videography ==
=== Music videos ===
Year	Song	Other Versions	Director	Notes	Ref.
Korean
2012	"Super Hero"		Hong Won-ki (Zanybros)	Debut single	
2012	"Rock Ur Body"		Hong Won-ki (Zanybros)	Guest appearance by Dasom of SISTAR	
2013	"On and On"		Song Won-young		
2013	"Hyde"		Hong Won-ki (Zanybros)	Guest appearance by Choi Jun Young	
2013	"G.R.8.U"		Hong Won-ki (Zanybros)		
2013	"Girls, Why?"		Hong Won-ki (Zanybros)	Collaboration with OKDAL	
2013	"Only U"		Hong Won-ki (Zanybros)		
2013	"Voodoo Doll"	Clean version	Hong Won-ki (Zanybros)	Guest appearance by Song Hye Na	
2014	"Thank You for Being Born"		—	Montage video	
2014	"Eternity"	Dance version	Hong Won-ki (Zanybros)	Guest appearance by Hana of Gugudan	
2014	"Error"	Lip & Dance version	Hong Won-ki (Zanybros)	Guest appearance by Youngji of KARA	
2015	"Chained Up"		GDW	Guest appearance by Sally of Gugudan	
2015	"Love Equation"		LUMPENS	Special single album	
2015	"Beautiful Liar"		Hwang Sue-ah	Debut single from VIXX LR, VIXX's first sub-unit	
2016	"Dynamite"		VM Project / FLIPEVIL	Guest appearance by Nayoung of Gugudan	
2016	"Fantasy"	Performance version; Drama version	VM Project / FLIPEVIL	Guest appearance by Nayoung of Gugudan	
2016	"The Closer"		Shin Hee-won	Guest appearance by Nayoung of Gugudan	
2016	"Milky Way"		Bishop		
2017	"Shangri-La"		Kim Woo-je		
2017	"Whisper"			VIXX LR single	
2018	"Scentist"				
2019	"Walking"				
Japanese
2014	"Error" (Short Version)		Hong Won-ki (Zanybros)	Japan debut single	
2015	"Can't Say" (Short Version)		—		
2016	"Depend On Me" (Short Version)		—		
2016	"Hana-Kaze" (花風) (Short Version)		—	3rd Japanese Single	
2018	"Reincarnation"				
Chinese
2015	"Destiny Love"		—	Montage video	
2015	"Chained Up"		GDW		

=== Video albums ===
Year	Album	Notes
2014	VIXX The First Special DVD "VOODOO"	
2015	VIXX LIVE FANTASIA UTOPIA in SEOUL DVD	Live recording of their Utopia concert in Seoul
2017	VIXX LIVE FANTASIA ELYSIUM DVD	

== Filmography ==
Note: For individual member's filmography, see their articles.

=== Reality shows ===
Year	Channel	Title	Notes
2012	Mnet	MyDOL	VIXX's pre-debut survival show. (8 Episodes)
2012	SBS MTV	VIXX's MTV Diary	Premiered on June 15. (64 Episodes)
2013	SBS MTV	Plan V Diary	Premiered on April 2. (5 Episodes)
2013	Mnet Japan	VIXX File	It was aired in 2013 in Japan on Mnet Japan for 12 Episodes.
2015	MBC Music	VIXX's One Fine Day	Follows the group during their holiday to Jejudo. (8 Episodes)
2016	Fuji TV NEXT	Project VIXX ~Invaders from Space~	It aired on January 31, 2016 in Japan.
2016	Fuji TV NEXT	Project VIXX 2 ~Invaders from Space Return~	It aired on July 29, 2016 in Japan.
2017	skyTravel	ASIA LOVED BY VIXX	Follows the group during their trip to Vietnam and Cambodia. (6 Episodes)
2017	Fuji TV NEXT	Project VIXX 3 ~Invaders from Space Forever~	

=== Drama ===
Year	Channel	Title	Member(s)	Role	Notes
2013	SBS	The Heirs	All	As themselves	Cameo (Episode 4)
