= List of VIXX concert tours =

The South Korean boyband VIXX have embarked on six concert tours under the title of VIXX Live Fantasia, namely "Hex Sign" in 2014, "Utopia" in 2015, "Elysium" in 2016, "Daydream" in 2017, "Lost Fantasia" in 2018 and ultimately "Parallel" in 2019. They have also held four showcases, the most notable being their debut showcase tour "The Milky Way Global Showcase" and two fan meetings.

== The Milky Way Global Showcase (2013) ==
The Milky Way Global Showcase
- Tour by VIXX
- Start date: October 20, 2013
- End date: November 17, 2013
- No. of shows: 1 in Malaysia; 2 in Japan; 1 in Sweden; 1 in Italy; 2 in United States; 1 in South Korea; 8 Total

VIXX concert chronology
- The Milky Way Global Showcase (2013); VIXX Live Fantasia — Hex Sign (2014)

The Milky Way Global Showcase (stylized as VIXX Global Showcase ‘The Milky Way’), is the debut live showcase tour by South Korean boy band, VIXX. The tour, organized by Jazzy Group, was held from October 20 to November 17, 2013, in Kuala Lumpur, Osaka, Tokyo, Stockholm, Milan, Dallas, Los Angeles and Seoul.

=== History ===
The tour was officially announced by the band on August 23, 2013, via their official Daum fancafe. VIXX also teased the tour with a video uploaded to their official YouTube account. The title of the showcase, "The Milky Way" is in reference to their fans (Starlights) all over the world representing the stars that comprise the entire galaxy The Milky Way. The showcase took place over the course of just two months, October and November.

=== Set list ===
This setlist is representative of encore show held in Seoul, South Korea on November 17, 2013.
Main Set

1. "On and On"
2. "Light Up the Darkness"
3. "Hyde"
4. "Only U"
5. "In the Name of Love" (Ken solo)
6. Hongbin & Hyuk stage (Special Joint Stage)
7. "껄렁껄렁" (Ravi solo)
8. "Please" (Lee So-ra cover) (Leo solo)
9. "LoveStoned" (N Solo Dance Stage)
10. "Voodoo Doll" (Preview)
11. "I Got a Boy + So Hot + 24 Hours" (Special Dance Stage)
12. "Love Letter"
13. "Super Hero"
14. "Rock Ur Body"

Encore

15. "Hyde" (Acoustic Remix Version)
16. "G.R.8.U"

=== Tour dates ===
Date	City	Country	Venue
October 20, 2013	Kuala Lumpur	Malaysia	HGH Convention Centre
October 23, 2013	Osaka	Japan	Osaka International Convention Centre
October 25, 2013	Tokyo	Japan	Nakano Sun Plaza
November 2, 2013	Stockholm	Sweden	Oscarsteatern
November 3, 2013	Milan	Italy	LIVECLUB MILANO
November 8, 2013	Dallas	United States	Verizon Theatre
November 10, 2013	Los Angeles	United States	Club Nokia
November 17, 2013	Seoul	South Korea	Olympic Gymnastics Arena

=== Media ===
Television Broadcast

Air Date	Country	Network	Concert
November 20, 2013	South Korea	SBS MTV	VIXX 2013 Global Showcase "The Milky Way Finale in Seoul"

== VIXX Live Fantasia — Hex Sign (2014) ==
VIXX Live Fantasia — Hex Sign
- Tour by VIXX
- Start date: July 18, 2014
- End date: September 14, 2014
- No. of shows: 3 in South Korea; 2 in Japan; 1 in Hungary; 1 in Poland; 7 Total

VIXX concert chronology
- The Milky Way Global Showcase (2013); VIXX Live Fantasia — Hex Sign (2014); VIXX US Tour (2014)

VIXX Live Fantasia – Hex Sign, simply known as VIXX Live Fantasia is the first solo concert and world tour by South Korean boy band, VIXX. The tour, produced by CJ E&M Music and Live and Jellyfish Entertainment will officially launch with VIXX's first three concerts from July 18–20 in Seoul.

=== History ===
VIXX's agency, Jellyfish Entertainment announced on May 30, "VIXX will be holding a two-day solo concert VIXX Live Fantasia – Hex Sign on July 19 and 20. VIXX will also be performing solo concerts in Japan, making its way to a world tour."

A content business team from CJ E&M Music and Live (which will be co-producing the concert with Jellyfish) stated, "Presenting its first solo concert since debut, VIXX has been working hard in order to present the visuals and performances that it has never before shown on broadcasts or stages. As the group has differentiated from other idol groups with its vampire or Jekyll and Hyde concepts, we will be presenting a concert reminding one of a fantasy world for 150 minutes."

In response to speedy fans who snatched up all the tickets for VIXX's upcoming first solo concert within 9 minutes, VIXX has added another date to their Seoul concert for July 18, which sold out within 10 minutes. Priority ticket sales for VIXX's official fanclub began on Auction Ticket on June 9 at 8 PM KST, and it was reported that the site crashed as fans rushed to grab the 7,000 tickets for each of the two concert dates. Within 9 minutes, the tickets had all sold out. According to CJ E&M Music and Live on the 13th, the additional concert date on July 18 also sold out within 10 minutes of ticket sales, showcasing how much fans want to go see VIXX live.

=== Set list ===
This setlist is representative of first two shows held in Seoul, South Korea on July 18 and 19, 2014.
Main Set

1. "Voodoo Doll"
2. "Secret Night"
3. "Hyde"
4. "Beautiful Killer"
5. "CHAOS"
6. "B.O.D.Y"
7. "Only U"
8. "Love, LaLaLa"
9. "A Cold Night" (Leo & Ken stage)
10. "Memory" {Ravi & Hyuk stage}
11. "Toxic" (N & Hongbin dance stage)
12. "Light Up the Darkness"
13. "Someday"
14. "Love Letter"
15. "Starlight"
16. "UUUUU"
17. "From Now On, You're Mine"
18. "Rock Ur Body"
19. "Thank You for Being Born"

Encore

19. "Super Hero"
20. "G.R.8.U"

Encore 2

21. "On and On"
22. <li value="22"

=== Tour dates ===
Date	City	Country	Venue	Attendance
July 18, 2014	Seoul	South Korea	Seoul Olympic Hall	11,000
July 19, 2014	Seoul	South Korea	Seoul Olympic Hall	11,000
July 20, 2014	Seoul	South Korea	Seoul Olympic Hall	11,000
August 21, 2014	Osaka	Japan	Orix Theater	7,500
August 23, 2014	Tokyo	Japan	Tokyo International Forum	7,500
September 12, 2014	Budapest	Hungary		
September 14, 2014	Warsaw	Poland	Progresja Music Zone	

== VIXX US Tour (2014) ==
VIXX US Tour, simply known as MUSICENKOR Presents: VIXX. The tour, organized by Limelight Entertainment was held on November 22 and November 23, 2014 in Chicago at Star Plaza Theater and in New York City at Terminal 5.

== VIXX Live Fantasia — Utopia (2015) ==
VIXX Live Fantasia — Utopia
- Tour by VIXX
- Start date: March 28, 2015
- End date: May 29, 2015
- No. of shows: 2 in South Korea; 2 in Japan; 1 in Philippines; 1 in Singapore; 6 Total

VIXX concert chronology
- VIXX US Tour (2014); VIXX Live Fantasia — Utopia (2015); VIXX Japan Live Tour – Depend On (2016)

VIXX Live Fantasia — Utopia is the second solo concert and world tour by South Korean boy band, VIXX. The tour, produced by CJ E&M Music and Live and Jellyfish Entertainment will officially launch with VIXX's first two concerts from March 28 and 29 in Seoul at the Olympic Gymnastics Arena.

=== Set list ===
1. Prologue: Missing Child
2. Opening: The Parade of Black X
3. "On and On"
4. "Voodoo Doll"
5. "Light Up the Darkness"
6. "Secret Night"
7. Bridge Performance: Surgery
8. "Cloning" (Hongbin Dance Solo)
9. "Ghost" (Ravi Solo)
10. "After Dark"
11. "Youth Hurts"
12. "Say U Say Me"
13. Lets Learn About Human Emotions VCR
14. "Call You Mine" (Jeff Bernat Cover) (Hyuk Solo)
15. "Rolling in the Deep" (Adele Cover) (Ken Solo)
16. "CHAOS"
17. "Time Machine"
18. "Rock Ur Body"
19. "Love Letter"
20. "Someday"
21. "Sad Ending"
22. Bridge Performance: Mother
23. "Words to Say" (Leo Solo)
24. "Self-Disunion" (N Dance Solo)
25. "Hyde"
26. "Beautiful Killer"
27. "Eternity"
28. Ending Video: End of the World
29. "Error"

Encore

30. "Starlight"
31. "Love Equation"
32. "From Now On, You’re Mine"
33. "G.R.8.U"

=== Tour dates ===
Date	City	Country	Venue
March 28, 2015	Seoul	South Korea	Olympic Gymnastics Arena
March 29, 2015	Seoul	South Korea	Olympic Gymnastics Arena
April 9, 2015	Yokohama	Japan	Yokohama Arena
April 12, 2015	Kobe	Japan	Kobe World Memorial Hall
May 2, 2015	Pasay	Philippines	Mall of Asia Arena
May 29, 2015	Singapore		Max Pavilion, Singapore Expo

=== DVD ===
A Live Recording of Utopia concert in Seoul was released on DVD on October 1, 2015. It contained two discs and had subtitles in Korean, English and Chinese.

[DISC 1] VIXX LIVE FANTASIA UTOPIA :: THE CONCERT
- Prologue: Missing Child
- Opening: The Parade of Black X
- 다칠 준비가 돼 있어
- 저주인형 (Voodoo Doll)
- 어둠 속을 밝혀줘 (Light Up The Darkness/Light Me Up)
- Secret Night
- Bridge Performance: Surgery
- Cloning (Hongbin Solo)
- Ghost (Ravi Solo)
- After Dark
- 청춘이 아파 (Youth Hurts)
- Say U Say Me
- Bridge Video: Feeling
- CHAOS
- Time Machine
- Rock Ur Body
- Love Letter
- Someday
- Sad Ending
- Bridge Performance: Mother
- 할 말 (Leo Solo)
- Self-Disunion (N Solo)
- hyde
- Beautiful Killer
- Eternity (기적)
- Ending Video: End of the World
- Error
[DISC 2] VIXX LIVE FANTASIA UTOPIA :: SPECIAL FEATURES
- ENCORE STARLIGHT
- 이별공식 (Love Equation)
- 오늘부터 내 여자 (From Now On, You're Mine)
- 대.다.나.다.너 (GR8U)

== VIXX Japan Live Tour – Depend On (2016) ==
VIXX Japan Live Tour – Depend On
- Tour by VIXX
- Associated album: Depend on Me
- Start date: March 24, 2016
- End date: May 1, 2016
- No. of shows: 6 Total

VIXX concert chronology
- VIXX Live Fantasia — Utopia (2015); VIXX Japan Live Tour – Depend On (2016); VIXX Live Fantasia — Elysium (2016)

=== Tour dates ===
Date	City	Country	Venue	Attendance
March 24, 2016	Osaka	Japan	Orix Theater	TBA
March 25, 2016	Osaka	Japan	Orix Theater	TBA
March 28, 2016	Fukuoka	Japan	Zepp Fukuoka	TBA
April 2, 2016	Toyohashi	Japan	Plaza Toyohashi	TBA
May 1, 2016	Yokohama	Japan	Pacifico Yokohama National Convention Hall	TBA

== VIXX Live Fantasia — Elysium (2016) ==
VIXX Live Fantasia — Elysium
- Tour by VIXX
- Start date: August 13, 2016
- End date: August 14, 2016
- No. of shows: 2 in South Korea

VIXX concert chronology
- VIXX Japan Live Tour — Depend On (2016); VIXX Live Fantasia — Elysium (2016); VIXX Live Fantasia — Daydream (2017)

VIXX Live Fantasia — Elysium is the third solo concert by South Korean boy band, VIXX.

=== Set list ===
1. "Chained Up"
2. "Light Up the Darkness"
3. "Secret Night"

FIRST MENT (Introduction)

4. "Spider"
5. "Maze"
6. "After Dark"
7. "Hot Enough"
8. "Bad Bye"

SECOND MENT

9. Ken's solo
10. Leo's solo
11. "DamnRa" (Ravi's solo)

VCR

12. "Fantasy"
13. "Love Me Do"
14. "Ain't No Sunshine" (Hongbin's solo) (Bill Withers)
15. "Because I Love You" (Hyuk's Solo) (Yoo Jaeha)
16. N's solo Contemporary Dance
17. "My Light"
18. "Someday"
19. "Us Now"
20. "On and On"
21. "Voodoo Doll"
22. "Hyde"

THIRD MENT

23. "Error"

Encore

24. "Eternity"
25. "Dynamite"
26. "Love Equation"
27. "Heaven"

=== Tour dates ===
Date	City	Country	Venue
August 13, 2016	Seoul	South Korea	Olympic Park Gymnastics Stadium
August 14, 2016	Seoul	South Korea	Olympic Park Gymnastics Stadium

=== DVD ===
A Live Recording of Elysium concert in Seoul was released on DVD on March 7, 2017. It contained two discs and had subtitles in Korean, English and Chinese.

[DISC 1] VIXX LIVE FANTASIA UTOPIA :: THE CONCERT
1. 사슬 (Chained Up)
2. 어둠 속을 밝혀줘 (Light Me Up)
3. Secret Night
4. Spider
5. MAZE
6. After Dark
7. Hot Enough
8. 손의 이별 (Badbye)
9. SOLO #1 [Ken] – 잠 못드는 밤에
10. SOLO #2 [Leo] – Trap
11. SOLO #3 [Ravi] – DamnRa
12. Fantasy
13. Love Me Do
14. SOLO #4 [Hongbin] – Ain't No Sunshine
15. SOLO #5 [Hyuk] – 사랑하기 때문에
16. SOLO #6 [N] – Destroy humanity
17. My Light
18. Someday
19. 지금 우린 (Us Now)
20. 다칠 준비가 돼 있어 (On And On)
21. 저주 인형 (Voodoo Doll)
22. hyde
[DISC 02] VIXX LIVE FANTASIA Special Features ◼ VIXX LIVE FANTASIA ELYSIUM Part 2
23. Error
24. 기적 (Eternity)
25. 다이너마이트 (Dynamite)
26. 이별공식 (Love Equation)
27. Heaven
- CONCERT POSTER & VCR Making Film
- CONCERT Making Film
- VIXX LIVE FANTASIA ELYSIUM Multi Angle [Fantasy] N/ LEO/ KEN/ RAVI/ HONGBIN/ HYUK

== VIXX Live Fantasia — Daydream (2017) ==
VIXX Live Fantasia - Daydream
- Tour by VIXX
- Start date: May 12, 2017
- End date: July 23, 2017
- No. of shows: 4 in South Korea; 4 in Japan; 8 Total

VIXX concert chronology
- VIXX Live Fantasia — Elysium (2016); VIXX Live Fantasia — Daydream (2017); VIXX Live Lost Fantasia (2018)

VIXX Live Fantasia — Daydream (literal name: "백일몽") is the fourth solo concert by South Korean boy band, VIXX. The concert, produced by CJ E&M Music and Live and Jellyfish Entertainment took place from May 12, 2017 to May 14, 2017 at Jamsil Arena in Seoul and in Busan on June 11, 2017, South Korea. The remaining four concerts were planned and executed at Japanese cities: in Nagoya on July 11, 2017, Tokyo on July 15, 2017 and lastly Osaka on July 23 and July 24, 2017.

=== Set lists ===
Seoul, South Korea
1. "Fantasy"
2. "Desperate"
3. "Six Feet Under"

FIRST MENT (Introduction)

4. "Dynamite"
5. "B.O.D.Y."
6. "Good Night & Good Morning"
7. "Romance Has Ended"
8. "Sad Ending"

SECOND MENT

9. "Lie Lie Lie" (Hongbin's solo)
10. "SO ROMANTIC" (Ken's solo)
11. "HUG U" (Hyuk's solo)
12. "Shangri-La"
13. "Blackout"

THIRD MENT

14. "Thank You For Being Born" + fan surprise event
15. "Up In The Sky" (Leo's solo)
16. Contemporary Dance to "Fate" (N's Solo)
17. "Hong gil dong" (Ravi's Solo)

VCR

18. "On and On"
19. "Hyde"

FOURTH MENT

20. "The Closer"
21. "Love Me Do"
21. "Chained Up"

FIFTH MENT

22. "Eternity"
23. "Voodoo Doll"

Encore

24. "STARLIGHT"
25. "Time Machine"
26. "Shooting Star"
27. "Heaven"
Tokyo, Japan
VCR
1. "Fantasy"
2. "Desperate"

FIRST MENT (Introduction)

3. "Dynamite"
4. "B.O.D.Y."

VCR

5. "Good Night & Good Morning"
7. "Romance Has Ended"
8. "The Closer"
9. "Love Me Do"

VCR

10. "Shangri-La"
11. "Blackout"
12. "Hanakaze" (Flower Wind)

VCR

13. "On and On"
14. "Chained Up" (Japanese Version)

SECOND MENT

20. "Depend On Me"
21. "Error" (Japanese Version)

Encore

24. "Love Equation"
25. "Heaven"

=== Tour dates ===
Date	City	Country	Venue
May 12, 2017	Seoul	South Korea	Jamsil Arena
May 13, 2017	Seoul	South Korea	Jamsil Arena
May 14, 2017	Seoul	South Korea	Jamsil Arena
June 11, 2017	Busan	South Korea	
July 11, 2017	Nagoya	Japan	
July 15, 2017	Tokyo	Japan	
July 23, 2017	Osaka	Japan	

=== DVD ===
A Live Recording of Daydream concert in Seoul was released on DVD on November 17, 2017. It contained three discs and had subtitles in Korean, English and Chinese.

[DISC 1] VIXX Live Fantasia 백일몽(DAY DREAM) Part 1
1. OPENING VIDEO “LIGHTS FADE AWAY”
2. Fantasy
3. Desperate
4. 늪 (Six Feet Under)
5. 다이너마이트 (Dynamite)
6. B.O.D.Y
7. BRIDGE VIDEO 1 “VIXX & U”
8. Good Night & Good Morning
9. 로맨스는 끝났다 (Romance Has Ended)
10. Sad Ending
11. SOLO #1 [Hongbin] 거짓말 거짓말 거짓말 ?이적 (Lie Lie Lie - Lee Juck)
12. SOLO #2 [Ken] SO ROMANTIC
13. SOLO #3 [Hyuk] 안아줄게 (Hug U)
14. BRIDGE VIDEO 2 “IN MY DREAMS”
15. 도원경 (Shangri-La)
16. Black Out
17. 태어나줘서 고마워 (Thank You For Being Born)
18. Love Letter
[DISC 2] VIXX Live Fantasia 백일몽(DAY DREAM) Part 2
1. SOLO #4 [Leo] UP IN THE SKY
2. SOLO #5 [N] 인연 ?이선희 (Fate ?Lee Sun Hee)
3. SOLO #6 [Ravi] 홍길동 (Hong gil dong)
4. BRIDGE VIDEO 3 “DREAMS OF STARLIGHTS.”
5. 다칠 준비가 돼 있어 (On and On)
6. Hyde
7. The Closer
8. Love Me Do
9. 사슬 (Chained up)
10. 기적 (ETERNITY)
11. 저주인형 (Voodoo Doll)
12. STARLIGHT
13. Time Machine
14. Shooting Star
15. Heaven
[DISC 3] VIXX Live Fantasia 백일몽(DAY DREAM) SPECIAL FEATURES
- Making Of “DAY DREAM” VIDEOS
- Making Of “DAY DREAM” Seoul Concert
- Making Of “DAY DREAM” Busan Concert

== VIXX Live Lost Fantasia (2018) ==
VIXX Live Lost Fantasia
- Tour by VIXX
- Start date: May 25, 2018
- End date: May 26, 2018
- No. of shows: 2 in South Korea

VIXX concert chronology
- VIXX Live Fantasia — Daydream (2017); VIXX Live Lost Fantasia (2018); VIXX Live Fantasia — Parallel (2018)

VIXX Live Fantasia — Daydream (literal name: "백일몽") is the fourth solo concert by South Korean boy band, VIXX. The concert, produced by CJ E&M Music and Live and Jellyfish Entertainment took place from May 25, 2018 to May 26, 2018 at the Jamsil Arena in Seoul, South Korea and from August 24 to August 26, 2018 in Japan.

=== Set list ===
1. "Odd Sense"
2. "Escape"
3. "Silence"

FIRST MENT (Introduction)

4. "Fantasy"
5. "Wild" (Ravi's solo stage)
6. "Into The Void"
7. "Six Feet Under"

SECOND MENT

8. "Trigger"
9. "Beautiful Killer"

VCR

10. "Allure" (Hongbin's solo stage)
11. "Scentist"
12. "Allure" (Leo's solo stage)
13. "Circle"

THIRD MENT

14. "My Valentine"
15. "Love Me Do"
16. Allure (Hyuk's solo stage)

VCR

17. Ballad (Ken's solo stage)
18. Mashup
- 닮아 (Resemble)
- 다가오네 (1, 2, 3, 4, 5)-차
- 가운 밤에 (On a Cold Night)
- 손의 이별 (Bad Bye)
19. "Us Now"

FOURTH MENT

20. "Chained Up"
21. "Blackout"
22. Conceptual (N's solo stage)
23. "Hyde"

FIFTH MENT

24. "Desperate"
25. "Wind of Starlight" + "Shangri La"

ENCORE

26. "Milky Way"
27. "Navy & Shining Gold"
28. "Heaven"

=== Tour dates ===
Date	City	Country	Venue
May 25, 2018	Seoul	South Korea	Jamsil Arena
May 26, 2018	Seoul	South Korea	Jamsil Arena
August 24, 2018	Osaka	Japan	Orix Theater
August 26, 2018	Yokohama	Japan	Pacifico Yokohama

=== DVD ===
A live recording of Lost Fantasia concert in Seoul on DVD and Blu-ray was announced on October 2, 2018 and released on November 09, 2018. It contained 2 discs with subtitles in Korean, Englisch and Chinese.

[DISC 1] VIXX Live Lost Fantasia Part 1
1. Odd Sense
2. Escape
3. Silence
4. Fantasy
5. [Ravi] Interlude “WILD” STAGE 1
6. Into The Void
7. 늪 (Six Feet Under)
8. Trigger
9. Beautiful Killer
10. [Hongbin] Interlude “ALLURE” STAGE 2
11. 향 (Scentist)
12. [Leo] Interlude “ALLURE” STAGE 3
13. Circle
14. My Valentine
15. Love Me do
16. [Hyuk] Interlude “ALLURE” STAGE 4
17. [Ken] Interlude “BALLAD” STAGE 5
18. Moments Mashup [닮아 (Resemble)-다가오네 (1, 2, 3, 4, 5)-차 # 가운 밤에 (On a Cold Night)-손의 이별 (Bad Bye)]
19. 지금 우린 (Us Now)
[DISC 2] VIXX Live Lost Fantasia Part 2 & Concert Making
1. 사슬 (Chained Up)
2. BLACK OUT
3. [N] Interlude “CONCEPTUAL” STAGE 6
4. Hyde
5. Desperate
6. The wind of Starlight + 도원경 (Shangri-La)
7. MILKY WAY
8. Navy & Shining Gold
9. Heaven
- POSTER MAKING FILM
- VCR MAKING FILM
- PRACTICE MAKING FILM
- REHEARSAL MAKING FILM
- D-DAY MAKING FILM

== VIXX Live Fantasia — Parallel (2019) ==
VIXX Live Fantasia Parallel
- Tour by VIXX
- Start date: September 28, 2019
- End date: October 17, 2019
- No. of shows: 2 in South Korea; 2 in Japan; 4 Total

VIXX concert chronology
- VIXX Live Fantasia — Daydream (2017); VIXX Live Fantasia - Parallel (2019)

VIXX Live Fantasia — Daydream (literal name: "백일몽") is the fourth solo concert by South Korean boy band, VIXX. The concert, produced by CJ E&M Music and Live and Jellyfish Entertainment took place from September 28, 2019 to September 29, 2019 at the Jamsil Arena in Seoul, South Korea and in Japan from October 16 to 17, 2019. It was the first concert without the full number of members with leader N missing because of him attending his military service since March 4, 2019.

== VIXX sub-unit's and member's solo concerts ==
=== Leo's solo concert - CANVAS (2018) ===
VIXX's Leo held a concert tour for his solo debut album CANVAS with locations in South Korea and Japan.

Tour dates

Date	City	Country	Venue
August 31, 2018	Seoul	South Korea	Bluesquare iMarket Hall
September 1, 2018	Seoul	South Korea	Bluesquare iMarket Hall
September 2, 2018	Seoul	South Korea	Bluesquare iMarket Hall
October 5, 2018	Tokyo	Japan	Zepp Tokyo
October 6, 2018	Osaka	Japan	Zepp Namba

== Showcases ==
=== VIXX ===
Associated album	Date	City	Country	Venue
Chained Up Showcase
Chained Up	November 10, 2015	Seoul	South Korea	AX Korea
Chained Up Showcase Tour
Chained Up	December 8, 2015	Beijing	China	—N/a
Chained Up	December 13, 2015	Shanghai	China	—N/a
Depend on Me Showcase
Depend on Me	—N/a	—N/a	Japan	—N/a
Zelos Showcase
Zelos	April 19, 2016	Seoul	South Korea	Lotte Card Art Center
Kratos Showcase
Kratos	October 31, 2016	Seoul	South Korea	YES24 Live Hall

=== VIXX LR ===
Associated album	Date	City	Country	Venue
VIXX LR Beautiful Liar Showcase
Beautiful Liar	August 17, 2015	Seoul	South Korea	Yes24 Muv Hall
VIXX LR 1st LIVE SHOWCASE TOUR Beautiful Liar in Japan
Beautiful Liar	January 6, 2016	Nagoya	Japan	Nagoya Diamond Hall
Beautiful Liar	January 10, 2016	Tokyo	Japan	Toyosu PIT
Beautiful Liar	January 15, 2016	Osaka	Japan	Osaka Business Park circular hall
VIXX LR LIVE Whisper Comeback Showcase
Whisper	August 28, 2017	Seoul	South Korea	
