= VIXX discography =

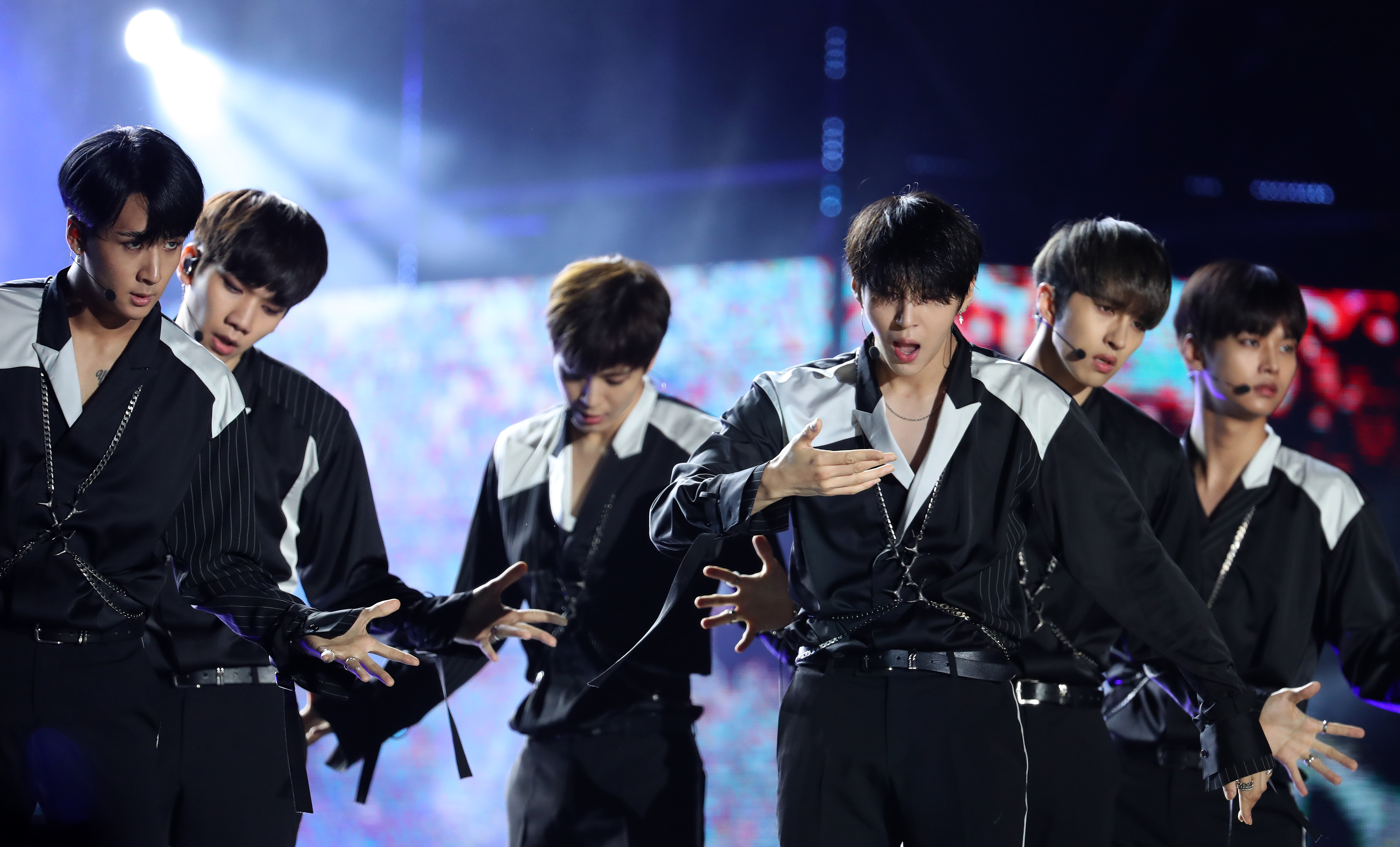
- VIXX performing at Korea Sale Festa in September 2016
- Studio albums: 5
- EPs: 6
- Soundtrack albums: 4
- Compilation albums: 2
- Singles: 26
- Video albums: 4
- Music videos: 25
- Collaborations: 6

The discography of South Korean boy band VIXX, formed by Jellyfish Entertainment consists of five studio albums, five extended plays (EPs), ten single albums and twenty-six singles.

== Albums ==
=== Studio albums ===
Title	Details	Peak chart positions						Sales
Title	Details	KOR	JPN	JPN Hot	TW	US Heat	US World	Sales
Korean
Voodoo	Released: November 25, 2013; Label: Jellyfish Entertainment, CJ E&M; Formats: CD, digital download	1	—	—	4	—	—	KOR: 102,406
Chained Up	Released: November 10, 2015; Label: Jellyfish Entertainment, CJ E&M; Formats: CD, digital download	1	—	—	1	—	3	KOR: 129,083
Eau de VIXX	Released: April 17, 2018; Label: Jellyfish Entertainment, CJ E&M; Formats: CD, digital download, SMC	1	36	—	4	25	3	KOR: 97,740; JPN: 1,906
Japanese
Depend on Me	Released: January 27, 2016; Label: Jellyfish Entertainment, CJ Victor Entertainment; Formats: CD, CD+DVD, digital download	—	4	—	—	—	—	JPN: 17,490
Reincarnation	Released: September 26, 2018; Label: Jellyfish Entertainment, Victor Entertainment; Format: CD, CD+DVD, digital download; Track list: Reincarnation; Scentist; Sugar; Last Note: Kieta Nochi no Rōsoku no Kaori (Last Note～消えた後の蝋燭の香り); Circle; My Valentine; But Not For Me; The Rain; Navy & Shining Gold; Shangri-La (桃源境)	—	9	8	—	—	—	JPN: 15,103
"—" denotes releases that did not chart or were not released in that region.

=== Single albums ===
Title	Details	Peak chart positions			Sales
Title	Details	KOR	JPN	TW	Sales
Korean
Super Hero	Released: May 24, 2012; Label: Jellyfish Entertainment, CJ E&M; Format: CD, digital download	18	—	—	KOR: 23,289
Rock Ur Body	Released: August 14, 2012; Label: Jellyfish Entertainment, CJ E&M; Format: CD, digital download	8	—	—	KOR: 28,647
On and On (다칠 준비가 돼 있어)	Released: January 17, 2013; Label: Jellyfish Entertainment, CJ E&M; Format: CD, digital download	4	—	—	KOR: 48,957
Eternity	Released: May 27, 2014; Label: Jellyfish Entertainment, CJ E&M; Format: CD, digital download	1	—	3	KOR: 91,536
Boys' Record	Special single album; Released: February 24, 2015; Label: Jellyfish Entertainment, CJ E&M; Format: CD, digital download	1	—	1	KOR: 107,173
Zelos	VIXX 2016 Conception Ker; Released: April 19, 2016; Label: Jellyfish Entertainment, CJ E&M; Format: CD, digital download	1	—	1	KOR: 108,870
Hades	VIXX 2016 Conception Ker; Released: August 12, 2016; Label: Jellyfish Entertainment, CJ E&M; Format: CD, digital download	1	—	2	KOR: 102,554
Japanese
Error -Japanese ver.-	Released: December 10, 2014; Label: Jellyfish Entertainment, CJ Victor Entertainment; Format: CD, CD+DVD	—	6	—	JPN: 19,381
Can't Say	Released: September 9, 2015; Label: Jellyfish Entertainment, CJ Victor Entertainment; Format: CD, CD+DVD; Track list: 1. Can't Say; 2. Mukae ni Ikō (迎えに行こう); 3. Can't Say (instrumental); 4. Mukae ni Ikō (instrumental)	—	4	—	JPN: 31,289
Hana-Kaze (花風)	Released: June 29, 2016; Label: Jellyfish Entertainment, CJ Victor Entertainment; Format: CD, CD+DVD; Track list: 1. Hana-Kaze (花風); 2. Moonlight; 3. Hana-Kaze (instrumental); 4. Moonlight (instrumental)	—	3	—	JPN: 32,411
"—" denotes releases that did not chart or were not released in that region.

=== Compilation albums ===
Title	Details	Peak chart positions			Sales
Title	Details	KOR	JPN	TW	Sales
Darkest Angels	Released: July 2, 2014; Label: Jellyfish Entertainment, CJ Victor Entertainment; Format: CD+DVD, digital download	—	10	—	JPN: 12,332
VIXX 2016 Conception Ker	Released: November 21, 2016; Label: Jellyfish Entertainment, CJ E&M; Format: CD+DVD, digital download	2	77	9	KOR: 18,082; JPN: 951
"—" denotes releases that did not chart or were not released in that region.

== Extended plays ==
Title	Details	Peak chart positions						Sales
Title	Details	KOR	JPN	JPN Hot	TW	US Heat	US World	Sales
Korean
Hyde	Released: May 20, 2013; Label: Jellyfish Entertainment, CJ E&M; Format: CD, digital download	3	—	—	8	—	7	KOR: 185,320
Hyde	Re-released: July 31, 2013 (Jekyll); Label: Jellyfish Entertainment, CJ E&M; Format: CD, digital download	3	—	—	5	—	—	KOR: 185,320
Error	Released: October 14, 2014; Label: Jellyfish Entertainment, CJ E&M; Format: CD, digital download	1	—	—	1	42	3	KOR: 93,239
Kratos	VIXX 2016 Conception Ker; Released: October 31, 2016; Label: Jellyfish Entertainment, CJ E&M; Format: CD, digital download	2	48	—	5	—	5	KOR: 97,176; JPN: 1,785
Shangri-La (桃源境 (도원경))	Released: May 15, 2017; Label: Jellyfish Entertainment, CJ E&M; Format: CD, digital download	2	37	—	3	13	4	KOR: 89,879; JPN: 2,370
Continuum	Released: November 21, 2023; Label: Jellyfish Entertainment, CJ E&M; Format: CD, digital download	8	—	—	—	—	—	KOR: 84,417
Japanese
Lalala: Ai o Arigatō (ラララ ～愛をありがとう～)	Released: September 27, 2017; Label: Jellyfish Entertainment, Victor Entertainment; Format: CD, digital download; Track list: Lalala: Ai o Arigatō (ラララ ～愛をありがとう～); Celebration!!; Crush My Mind; How 'bout you; Saboten (サボテン); Lalala: Ai o Arigatō (instrumental); Celebration!! (instrumental); Crush My Mind (instrumental); How 'bout you (instrumental); Saboten (instrumental)	—	3	2	—	—	—	JPN: 29,900+
"—" denotes releases that did not chart or were not released in that region.

== Singles ==
=== As lead artist ===
Title	Year	Peak chart positions					Sales	Album
Title	Year	KOR	KOR Hot	JPN	JPN Hot	US World	Sales	Album
Korean
"Super Hero"	2012	112	—	—	—	—	KOR (DL): 64,195+	Super Hero
"Rock Ur Body"	2012	118	83	—	—	—	KOR (DL): 46,489+	Rock Ur Body
"On and On" (다칠 준비가 돼 있어)	2013	25	96	—	—	—	KOR (DL): 159,157+	On and On
"Hyde"	2013	35	57	—	—	6	KOR (DL): 183,354+	Hyde
"G.R.8.U" (대.다.나.다.너)	2013	14	13	—	—	10	KOR (DL): 215,760+	Jekyll
"Only U" (대답은 너니까)	2013	40	42	—	—	8	KOR (DL): 76,294+	Voodoo
"Voodoo Doll" (저주인형)	2013	7	53	—	—	4	KOR (DL): 170,170+	Voodoo
"Turn Around and Look at Me" (나를 돌아봐)	2014	71	87	—	—	—	—N/a	DEUX 20th Anniversary; Tribute Album Part.7
"Eternity" (기적)	2014	7	25	—	—	3	KOR (DL): 234,119+	Eternity
"Error"	2014	5	*	—	—	4	KOR (DL): 187,111+	Error
"Love Equation" (이별공식)	2015	2	*	—	—	9	KOR (DL): 282,476+	Boys' Record
"Chained Up" (사슬)	2015	8	*	—	—	4	KOR (DL): 185,778+	Chained Up
"Dynamite" (다이너마이트)	2016	14	*	—	—	4	KOR (DL): 181,945+	Zelos
"Fantasy"	2016	22	*	—	—	5	KOR (DL): 103,704+	Hades
"The Closer"	2016	8	*	—	—	14	KOR (DL): 99,281+	Kratos
"Milky Way"	2016	96	*	—	—	—	KOR (DL): 14,771+	VIXX 2016 Conception Ker
"Shangri-La" (도원경 (桃源境))	2017	13	*	—	—	6	KOR (DL): 120,390+	Shangri-La
"Scentist" (향)	2018	74	26	—	—	6	—N/a	Eau de VIXX
"Walking" (걷고있다)	2019	— (Note: "Walking" did not enter the Gaon Digital Chart, but peaked at number 79 on the component Download Chart.)	—	—	—	—	—N/a	Non-album singles
"Parallel" (평행우주)	2019	— (Note: "Parallel" did not enter the Gaon Digital Chart, but peaked at number 176 on the component Download Chart.)	—	—	—	—	—N/a	Non-album singles
"Gonna Be Alright"	2023	— (Note: "Gonna Be Alright" did not enter the Circle Digital Chart, but peaked at number 34 on the component Download Chart.)	—	—	—	—	—N/a	Non-album singles
"Amnesia"	2023	— (Note: "Amnesia" did not enter the Circle Digital Chart, but peaked at number 19 on the component Download Chart.)	*	—	—	—	—N/a	Continuum
Japanese
"Error" (Japanese version)	2014	—	*	6	18	—	JPN (CD): 19,381+	Depend on Me
"Can't Say"	2015	—	*	4	9	—	JPN (CD): 31,289+	Depend on Me
"Depend on Me"	2016	—	*	—	—	—	—N/a	Depend on Me
"Hana-Kaze" (花風)	2016	—	*	3	3	—	JPN (CD): 26,613+	Non-album single
"Lalala: Ai o Arigatō" (ラララ ～愛をありがとう～)	2017	—	*	—	—	—	—N/a	Lalala: Ai o Arigatō
"Reincarnation"	2018	—	—	—	—	—	—N/a	Reincarnation
"Aruiteiru" (歩いている)	2019	—	—	21	—	—	JPN (CD): 2,888	Non-album singles
"Parallel"	2019	—	—	27	—	—	JPN (CD): 2,077	Non-album singles
Chinese
"Destiny Love" (命中注定)	2015	—	*	—	—	—	—N/a	Boys' Record
"Error" (Chinese version)	2015	—	*	—	—	—	—N/a	Non-album singles
"Chained Up" (Chinese version)	2015	—	*	—	—	—	—N/a	Non-album singles
"—" denotes releases that did not chart or were not released in that region. Note: Gaon Music Chart no longer releases download sales figures from January 2018 onward. Note: Billboard's Korea K-Pop Hot 100 was introduced in August 2011 and discontinued in July 2014. It was reintroduced on December 20, 2017.

== Collaborations ==
Title	Year	Peak chart position	Album
Title	Year	KOR	Album
"Because It's Christmas" (크리스마스니까) (with Sung Si-kyung, Park Hyo-shin, Lee Seok-hoon, Seo In-guk)	2012	1	Jelly Christmas 2012 Heart Project
"Girls, Why?" (여자는 왜?) (with Okdal)	2013	57	Y.BIRD from Jellyfish Island With VIXX & OKDAL
"Winter Propose" (겨울고백) (with Sung Si-kyung, Park Hyo-shin, Seo In-guk, Little Sister)	2013	1	Jelly Christmas 2013
"Love in the Air" (사랑난로) (with Seo In-guk, Park Jung-ah, Park Yoon-ha)	2015	14	Jelly Christmas 2015 – 4랑
"Falling" (니가 내려와) (with Seo In-guk, Gugudan, Park Yoon-ha, Park Jung-ah, Kim Gyu-sun, Kim Ye-won, Jiyul)	2016	34	Jelly Christmas 2016

== Other charted songs ==
Title	Year	Peak chart positions	Album
Title	Year	KOR	Album
"Stop Resisting" (그만 버티고) (featuring Girl's Day's Minah)	2013	146	Hyde
"Jekyll"	2013	175	Jekyll
"What to Do" (어떡하지)	2013	124	Jekyll
"Voodoo"	2013	134	Voodoo
"Beautiful Killer"	2013	85	Voodoo
"Someday"	2013	79	Voodoo
"B.O.D.Y"	2013	93	Voodoo
"Secret Night"	2013	88	Voodoo
"Say U Say Me"	2013	87	Voodoo
"Love Come True" (오늘부터 내 여자)	2013	84	Voodoo
"Thank You for My Love" (태어나줘서 고마워)	2013	72	Voodoo
"Sad Ending"	2014	63	Eternity
"Love, LaLaLa"	2014	69	Eternity
"After Dark"	2014	78	Error
"Youth Hurts" (청춘이 아파)	2014	64	Error
"Time Machine	2014	75	Error
"What U Waiting For"	2014	79	Error
"On a Cold Night" (차가운 밤에)	2015	23	Boys' Record
"Memory" (Note: Credited as VIXX but only features members Ravi and Hyuk.)	2015	27	Boys' Record
"My Light" (Note: "My Light" was recorded by VIXX as a whole, and included in their sub-unit VIXX LR's debut mini album, Beautiful Liar.)	2015	91	Beautiful Liar
"Maze"	2015	82	Chained Up
"Hot Enough"	2015	87	Chained Up
"Stop It Girl"	2015	91	Chained Up
"Out of Sorts" (부시시)	2015	96	Chained Up
"Bad Bye" (손의 이별)	2016	84	Zelos
"Six Feet Under" (늪)	2016	— (Note: "Six Feet Under" did not enter the Gaon Digital Chart, but peaked at number 78 on the Gaon Download Chart.)	Zelos
"Love Me Do"	2016	— (Note: "Love Me Do" did not enter the Gaon Digital Chart, but peaked at number 58 on the Gaon Download Chart, it also charted at number 16 on the Billboard World Digital Songs chart.)	Hades
"Butterfly Effect" (나비 효과)	2016	— (Note: "Butterfly Effect" did not enter the Gaon Digital Chart, but peaked at number 65 on the Gaon Download Chart.)	Hades
"Romance Is Over" (로맨스는 끝났다)	2016	91	Kratos
"Desperate"	2016	93	Kratos
"Shooting Star"	2016	— (Note: "Shooting Star" did not enter the Gaon Digital Chart, but peaked at number 86 on the Gaon Download Chart.)	Kratos
"Good Night & Good Morning"	2016	— (Note: "Good Night & Good Morning" did not enter the Gaon Digital Chart, but peaked at number 83 on the Gaon Download Chart.)	Kratos
"Black Out"	2017	98	Shangri-La
"If You Come Tonight"	2023	— (Note: "If You Come Tonight" did not enter the Circle Digital Chart, but peaked at number 47 on the Circle Download Chart.)	Continuum
"Savage"	2023	— (Note: "Savage" did not enter the Circle Digital Chart, but peaked at number 48 on the Circle Download Chart.)	Continuum
"Chemical"	2023	— (Note: "Chemical" did not enter the Circle Digital Chart, but peaked at number 49 on the Circle Download Chart.)	Continuum
"Lilac" (라일락)	2023	— (Note: "Lilac" did not enter the Circle Digital Chart, but peaked at number 50 on the Circle Download Chart.)	Continuum
"—" denotes releases that did not chart or were not released in that region.

== Soundtrack appearances ==
Title	Year	Peak chart position	Sales	Album
Title	Year	KOR	Sales	Album
"Alive"	2016	— (Note: "Alive" did not enter the Gaon Digital Chart, but peaked at number 99 on the Gaon Download Chart.)	KOR (DL):14,064+	Moorim School: Saga of the Brave OST
"The King"	2016	—	—N/a	Moorim School: Saga of the Brave OST
"Take Your Hand"	2017	—	—N/a	Man to Man OST
"Is It Love?" (사랑인걸까?)	2018	—	—N/a	Are You Human? OST
"——" denotes releases that did not chart or were not released in that region.

== Videography ==
=== Music videos ===
Title	Year	Other versions	Notes
Korean
"Super Hero"	2012	—N/a	—N/a
"Rock Ur Body"	2012	—N/a	Guest appearance by Dasom of SISTAR
"On and On"	2013	—N/a	—N/a
"Hyde"	2013	—N/a	—N/a
"G.R.8.U"	2013	—N/a	—N/a
"Girls, Why?"	2013	—N/a	Collaboration with OKDAL
"Only U"	2013	—N/a	—N/a
"Voodoo Doll"	2013	Clean version	—N/a
"Eternity"	2014	Dance version	Guest appearance by Hana of Gugudan
"Error"	2014	Lip & Dance version	Guest appearance by Youngji of KARA
"Love Equation"	2015	—N/a	—N/a
"Chained Up"	2015	—N/a	—N/a
"Dynamite"	2016	—N/a	Guest appearance by Nayoung of Gugudan
"Fantasy"	2016	Performance version; Drama version	Guest appearance by Nayoung of Gugudan
"The Closer"	2016	—N/a	Guest appearance by Nayoung of Gugudan
"Milky Way"	2016	—N/a	—N/a
"Shangri-La"	2017	—N/a	—N/a
"Scentist"	2018	—N/a	—N/a
"Walking"	2019	—N/a	—N/a
"Amnesia"	2023	—N/a	—N/a
Japanese
"Error"	2014	—N/a	—N/a
"Can't Say"	2015	—N/a	—N/a
"Depend On Me"	2016	—N/a	—N/a
"Hana-Kaze"	2016	—N/a	—N/a
"Lalala: Ai o Arigatō"	2017	—N/a	—N/a
"Reincarnation"	2018	—N/a	—N/a
Chinese
"Chained Up"	2015	—N/a	—N/a

=== Video albums ===
Title	Details	Peak chart positions
Title	Details	JPN
VIXX The First Special DVD "Voodoo"	Released: March 1, 2014; Language: Korean, English, Japanese; Labels: Jellyfish Entertainment; Formats: DVD	22
VIXX Live Fantasia Utopia in Seoul DVD	Released: October 1, 2015; Language: Korean, English, Chinese; Labels: Jellyfish Entertainment; Formats: DVD	—
VIXX Live Fantasia Elysium DVD	Released: March 7, 2017; Language: Korean, English, Chinese; Labels: Jellyfish Entertainment; Formats: DVD	—
VIXX Live Fantasia 백일몽 Daydream DVD	Released: November 17, 2017; Language: Korean, English, Chinese; Labels: Jellyfish Entertainment; Formats: DVD	—
"—" denotes releases that did not chart or were not released in that region. Note: There is no chart for DVD sales in South Korea.

== See also ==
- VIXX LR § Discography
- List of songs recorded by VIXX
- List of awards and nominations received by VIXX

== Notes ==
Notes

Footnotes
