= Darkest Angels =

Compilation album by VIXX
- Released: July 2, 2014
- Genre: K-pop, dance-pop
- Language: Korean
- Label: Jellyfish Entertainment, CJ Victor Entertainment

VIXX chronology
Eternity (2014)	Darkest Angels (2014)	Error (2014)

Darkest Angels is the first compilation album by South Korean boy band VIXX. The album was released on July 2, 2014 in Japan under the labels of Jellyfish Entertainment and CJ Victor Entertainment. To commemorate and promote the album, VIXX held a high-touch event for fans in Tokyo on the 5th and 6 July 2014. The album placed at number 10 for five consecutive weeks on the Oricon chart and sold 12,332 copies.

== Track listing ==
CD Track Listing
No.	Title	From the album	Length
1.	"奇跡" ("Eternity")	Eternity	3:04
2.	"デ・ダ・ナ・ダ・ノ" ("G.R.8.U")	Jekyll	3:30
3.	"ハイド" ("Hyde")	Voodoo	3:16
4.	"呪いの人形" ("Voodoo Doll")	Voodoo	3:36
5.	"傷つく準備ができてる" ("On and On")	Voodoo	3:42
6.	"答えはキミだから" ("Only U")	Voodoo	3:45
7.	"Rock Ur Body"	Voodoo	3:42
8.	"Super Hero"	Voodoo	3:30
9.	"ジキル" ("Jekyll")	Jekyll	0:43
10.	"暗闇を照らせ" ("Light Up the Darkness")	Hyde / Jekyll	3:01
11.	"もう耐えないで" ("Stop Resisting") (ft. Minah of Girl's Day)	Hyde / Jekyll	3:45
12.	"Love Letter"	Hyde / Jekyll	4:35
13.	"アイドルやりたくない" ("Don't Want to Be an Idol")	On and On	3:45
14.	"痛いのに好きだよ" ("UUUUU")	Rock Ur Body	3:49
15.	"Someday"	Voodoo	3:56
16.	"ふたりの愛が生まれた日" ("Thank You For Being Born")	Voodoo	4:17

Limited Edition Music Video DVD (A ~ F)
No.	Title	Length
1.	"Super Hero"	3:39
2.	"Rock Ur Body"	4:22
3.	"傷つく準備ができてる" ("On and On")	3:16
4.	"ハイド" ("Hyde")	3:20
5.	"デ・ダ・ナ・ダ・ノ" ("G.R.8.U")	3:40
6.	"呪いの人形" ("Voodoo Doll") (clean version)	3:34
7.	"答えはキミだから" ("Only U")	3:48
8.	"奇跡" ("Eternity")	3:09
9.	"呪いの人形" ("Voodoo Doll" (19 prohibited version))	4:27
