= Baekseok Arts University =

Private art college in South Korea

Coordinates: 37°28′48″N 126°59′47″E

- 백석예술대학교
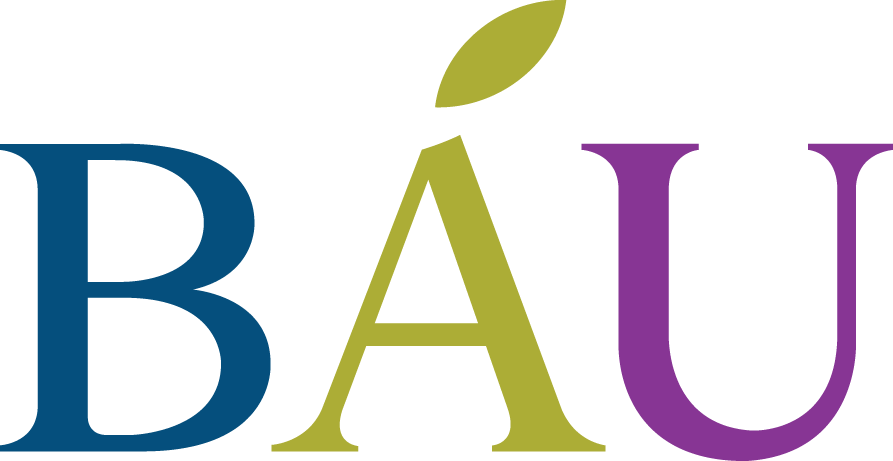
- Type: University
- Established: 1983
- Location: Seocho District, Seoul, South Korea
- Campus: Seoul, South Korea
- Website: http://www.bau.ac.kr
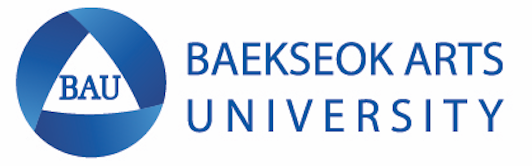

Baekseok Arts University (BAU) is a private Christian art college focused on Music and Design located in Seoul, South Korea, founded in 1983. BAU has 7,000 students in 9 departments.

== Areas of study ==
Areas of study include:

- Music: Classical, Traditional Performing, Contemporary Music, Musical Theatre, Performance Project, Playwriting, Acting
- Design: Visual Communication, Interior, Media, Advertising
- Painting, Fine Art
- Food Industry
- Tourism
- Airline Service
- Languages: English, Japanese, Chinese
- Education: Early Childhood Education, Teacher Education
- Social Welfare
- Business Administration

== Notable alumni ==
- Minzy – singer and dancer, former member of 2NE1
- Ken – singer and actor, member of VIXX
- Ravi – rapper and singer-songwriter, member of VIXX
- Leo – singer-songwriter, member of VIXX
- Jaehyuk – singer and dancer, member of Treasure
- Hwang Yunseong – singer and dancer, member of Drippin
- Jung Yeonjoo - singer and dancer, member of lilli lilli and former member of P.O.P
