= Mythforce =

- Developer: Beamdog
- Publisher: Aspyr
- Engine: Unreal Engine 5
- Platforms: Nintendo Switch; PlayStation 4; PlayStation 5; Windows; Xbox One; Xbox Series X/S
- Release: WW: September 12, 2023
- Genre: action RPG
- Modes: Single-player, multiplayer

Mythforce is a 2023 roguelite video game developed by Beamdog and published by Aspyr. It was released for Windows, PlayStation 4 and 5, Xbox One and X/S, and Nintendo Switch.

== Gameplay ==
Players control one of four heroes based on Saturday-morning cartoons and enter procedurally generated dungeons. The characters include a melee-oriented knight who can throw her shield, a rogue who can teleport behind enemies and backstab them, a ranger who can shoot fire arrows, and a mage who casts fireballs. Mythforce is played from a first-person perspective and is a dungeon crawl game with cel-shaded art. Like modern roguelite games, players retain some progression after losing the game, and they can use gold found before they died to improve their next character. It has cooperative multiplayer that supports up to four people.

== Development ==
Developer Beamdog is based in Edmonton, Canada. Studio co-founder Trent Oster said he was dubious of the concept when he first heard it, in part because they proposed to use Unreal Engine, which was known for photorealistic graphics. Oster gave the developers three months to prove the concept. When he saw the result, he agreed to make the game. Beamdog consulted with Mark Cappello, an artist who has worked on both cartoons and video games, to get the aesthetics correct. The cartoon-like graphics require what they said is "a surprisingly large amount" of custom post-processing. Because they were avoiding realistic graphics, many premade tools designed for the Unreal Engine were not usable. For the soundtrack, Beamdog asked Ross Lara to compose something reminiscent of ThunderCats, M.A.S.K., and SilverHawks. Mythforce entered early access on April 20, 2022, and Aspyr released it for Windows, Xbox One and Series X/S, PlayStation 4 and 5, and Nintendo Switch on September 12, 2023.

== Reception ==
=== Early access ===
PC Gamer, who reviewed the game in April 2022, said that the focus on roguelite meta-progression seemed to be at the expense of variety during the current run and causing the combat to be too punitive. Eurogamer reviewed it the same month. Though they praised the art, they found the gameplay "simultaneously overwhelming and glacially paced". They felt the characters were underpowered, which they said was "especially jarring" compared to its cartoon influences, which they felt implied that they would be playing as powerful heroes.

=== Release ===
Mythforce received mixed reviews on Metacritic. Rock Paper Shotgun said they were not blown away by Mythforce and were expecting something funnier and more reliant on its cartoon-like aesthetics. Though they said it lacks the variety and staying power of its competitors, they recommended it to fans of cooperative multiplayer games who are looking for mindless fun. Nintendo World Report said they encountered so many software bugs and performance issues on the Switch that it was "playable only by the skin of its teeth". They recommended against playing on Switch until it received a patch, though they said it was, at best, "a fun but uninteresting game".
