= Y.BIRD from Jellyfish Island With Seo In Guk =

Single by Seo In-guk
- Released: February 4, 2013
- Genre: K-pop
- Length: 7:12
- Label: Jellyfish Entertainment

Seo In-guk Korean singles chronology
"Take#1 - Vol. 3" (2011)	"Y.BIRD from Jellyfish Island With Seo In Guk" (2013)

Music video
- "I Can't Live Because of You" on YouTube

"Y.BIRD from Jellyfish Island With Seo In Guk" is the eighth digital single by South Korean singer, Seo In-guk. The single was released on February 4, 2013, containing the title track "I Can't Live Because of You" featuring Verbal Jint. "I Can't Live Because of You" tops various online charts upon its release including Bugs, Cyworld and Soribada.

== Background and release ==
On January 30, 2012, aphoto of Seo in recording studio spread in the internet gaining interest of fans. It was then reported that he will indeed release a new track soon. On February 4, the single was released digitally and features Verbal Jint.

== Music video ==
The teaser for the music video was uploaded through Jellyfish Entertainment's official YouTube account. The full music video was released on the same day of the single's release.

== Track listing ==
※ Bold track title means it is the title track in the album.

No.	Title	Lyrics	Music	Arrangement	Length
1.	"I Can't Live Because of You" (feat. Verbal Jint)	Min Yeon-jae, Verbal Jint	Hwang Sejun, Kim Do-hoon	Kim Do-hoon	3:36
2.	"I Can't Live Because of You" (Instrumental)		Hwang Sejun, Kim Do-hoon	Kim Do-hoon	3:36
Total length:					7:12

== Chart ==
Chart	Peak position
Gaon Singles chart	4
Gaon Download Singles chart	2

== Release history ==
Region	Date	Format	Labels
Worldwide	4 February 2013	iTunes Store	Jellyfish Entertainment

== See also ==
- Y.Bird from Jellyfish Island
