= Ross Lara =

American composer, producer, and engineer

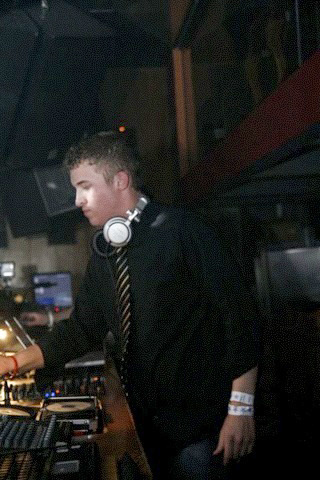
- Lara performing at FUR Nightclub in Washington, D.C., December 2007

Background information
- Origin: United States
- Occupations: Composer, producer, audio engineer
- Years active: 2009–present

Ross Lara is an American composer, producer, and audio engineer.

== Career ==
Lara began his music career as a DJ before moving into production and composition.

In 2022, Lara relocated his production company, Archipelago Entertainment, to Breckenridge, Colorado. The new facility was designed to support immersive audio, specifically integrating a Dolby Atmos mixing suite for music and film projects.

In a 2022 interview published during the game's development, video game developer Beamdog identified Ross Lara as the composer for the video game MythForce.

== Selected credits ==
Year	Title / project	Primary artist or production	Lara credited as	Ref.
2023	MythForce	Beamdog / Aspyr	Composer	
2021	"I'll Be Home for Christmas"	Tate McRae	Synthesizer; keyboards	
2018	"Who Waits for Love"	SHINee	Composer; arranger	
2018	"No Better Than This"	JEONG SEWOON	Composer; arranger	
2013	"Dream Girl"	SHINee	Composer	
2013	"G.R.8.U"	VIXX	Composer	
2013	"Say U Say Me"	VIXX	Composer	
2013	"Want U Back"	100%	Composer	
2011	"We Don't Stop"	Fiestar	Composer	

== External sources ==
- Official website
- The Spacies band on Instagram
