= Voodoo (VIXX album) =

Studio album by VIXX
- Released: November 25, 2013
- Recorded: 2012–2013
- Genre: K-pop
- Length: 51:00
- Language: Korean
- Labels: Jellyfish Entertainment, CJ E&M Music

VIXX chronology
Y.BIRD from Jellyfish Island With VIXX & OKDAL (2013)	Voodoo (2013)	Eternity (2014)

Singles from Voodoo
- 1. "Only U" Released: November 7, 2013; 2. "Voodoo Doll" Released: November 20, 2013

Voodoo is the first studio album by the South Korean boy band VIXX. It was released on November 25, 2013 under the label of Jellyfish Entertainment. It features two singles, with the track "Voodoo Doll" being the last promoted.

== Promotion ==
VIXX first performed "Voodoo Doll" live during their Milky Way Global Showcase finale concert in Seoul which took place on November 17, 2013. The first broadcast performance of "Voodoo Doll" was shown on November 20 through a televised premiere of VIXX's finale concert on SBS MTV. Later that same day, VIXX had their first comeback stage on MBC Music's Show Champion, performing both "Only U" and "Voodoo Doll". On December 6, the group won their first music show award on Music Bank with "Voodoo Doll".

== Singles ==
=== "Only U" ===
"Only U" (Korean: 대답은 너니까; RR: Daedabeun Neonikka; lit. "Because You're the Answer") served as a pre-release single. It was produced by songwriter Shinsadong Tiger, and co-produced by 4Beontaja and Jellyfish Entertainment CEO Hwang Se-jun. Shinsadong Tiger and 4Beontaja arranged the song. VIXX's rapper Ravi teamed up with writer Kim Ji-hyang to write the lyrics.

The music video for the song was directed by Hong Won Ki and filmed in Stockholm in Sweden, showcasing the city's architecture. The single peaked at number 40 on the Gaon Singles Chart, and number 18 on the Social Chart.

=== "Voodoo Doll" ===
"Voodoo Doll" (Korean: 저주인형; RR: Jeoju Inhyeong; lit. "Curse Doll) is the album's lead single. "Voodoo Doll" was written by songwriter Kim Eana and Ravi (who wrote the rap portion of the song) and composed by Hyuk Shin, who has produced songs such as SHINee's "Dream Girl" and EXO's "Growl". The song's music video was directed by ZanyBros.

The music video was released on November 19, 2013. Filmed in the style of a horror movie, it opens with graphic images of organs and flesh being cut, stabbed, and stapled together. The mutilated members are imprisoned in individual chambers. Their female captor gleefully controls and tortures them through the voodoo doll. The members escape, but Hongbin is recaptured. In the end, he completely transforms into a voodoo doll.

Because of the disturbing imagery and violence, both the music video and choreography were censored. The music video failed to meet the regulations and was designated with an R rating. A clean version was later released on November 24, 2013. The choreography to "Voodoo Doll" incorporated a staff that “stabbed” the members at various points. The major networks banned the choreography, citing it was too violent. Their company expressed disappointment stating, “The part that was a problem is where the VIXX members turn into voodoo dolls. The choreography is symbolic of the voodoo doll's sad fate.” The choreography was eventually modified for broadcast.

The single peaked at number 7 on the Gaon Singles Chart and number 53 on Billboard's K-Pop Hot 100. It also charted at number 3 on the Gaon Social Chart.

== Track listing ==
The credits are adapted from the official homepage of the group.

No.	Title	Lyrics	Music	Length
1.	"Voodoo" (Intro)		MELODESIGN	01:11
2.	"Voodoo Doll" (저주인형; Jeojuinhyeong)	Kim Eana	Hyuk Shin, Deanfluenza, 2xxx!, RE:ONE, Lee JaeHoon	03:36
3.	"Beautiful Killer"	Lee Yu-jin, Ravi	Albi Albertsson, Chris Wahle	03:20
4.	"Someday"	Kim Ji-hyang, Ravi, MELODESIGN	MELODESIGN, Keeproots, Fascinating	03:56
5.	"Only U" (대답은 너니까; Daedabeun Neonikka) (Translation: "Because You're the Answer")	Kim Ji-hyang, Ravi	Hwang Se-jun, 4번타자, Shinsadong Tiger	03:45
6.	"B.O.D.Y"	Kim Mi-jin	Albi Albertsson, Andreas Carlsson, Andreas Oberg, Stephan Elfgren	03:13
7.	"Secret Night"	Ravi	Ravi	03:16
8.	"Say U Say Me"	Ravi, Kiggen	Hyuk Shin, DK, Ross Lara	03:24
9.	"Love Come True" (오늘부터 내 여자; Oneulbuteo Nae Yeoja) (Translation: "From Now On, You’re Mine")	Kim Ji-hyang, Ravi	MELODESIGN	03:21
10.	"Thank You For Being Born" (태어나줘서 고마워; Taeeonajwoseo Gomawo)	Kim Ji-hyang, MELODESIGN	MELODESIGN	04:17
11.	"Super Hero"	Kiggen, Ravi (rap parts)	Brent Paschke, Jimmy Richard Drew	03:30
12.	"Rock Ur Body"	Choi Kyu-sung, Swings	Shinsadong Tiger, Choi Kyu-Sung	03:42
13.	"On and On" (다칠 준비가 돼 있어; Dachil Junbiga Dwae Isseo) (Translation: "I'm Ready to Get Hurt")	Kim Eana, Ravi (rap parts)	Hwang Se-jun, Albi Albertsson, Ricky Hanley, Kirstine Lind	03:14
14.	"Hyde"	Kim Eana, Ravi (rap parts)	Hwang Se-jun, D3O	03:16
15.	"Voodoo Doll" (Inst.)		Hyuk Shin, Deanfluenza, 2xxx!, RE:ONE, Lee JaeHoon	03:36
Total length:				51:00

== Release history ==
Region	Date	Format	Label
South Korea	November 25, 2013	CD; Digital download	Jellyfish Entertainment; CJ E&M Music
Worldwide	November 25, 2013	Digital download	Jellyfish Entertainment

== Chart performance ==
=== Album ===
Chart	Peak position	Sales
South Korea (Gaon Music Chart weekly album)	1	KOR: 102,406
Taiwan (FIVE-MUSIC Korea-Japan Album Chart)	4	KOR: 102,406

=== Singles ===
Chart	Peak position	
Chart	"Voodoo Doll"	"Only U"
South Korea (Gaon Digital Chart)	7	40
South Korea (Gaon Social Chart)	3	18
Billboard (Korea K-Pop Hot 100)	53	42
Billboard (US World)	4	8

== Awards and nominations ==
=== Awards ===
Year	Award	Nominated work	Result
KMC Radio Awards
2013	Best Music Video	"Voodoo Doll"	Won
Gaon Chart Music Awards
2013	4th Quarter Best Selling Record Award	"Voodoo Doll"	Nominated

=== Music program awards ===
Song	Music show	Date
"Voodoo Doll"	Music Bank	December 6, 2013

== See also ==
- List of Gaon Album Chart number ones of 2013
