= Y.Bird from Jellyfish Island =

Compilation album by Lee Seok Hoon, Seo In-guk, VIXX & OKDAL, Leo X LYn
- Released: 2013
- Genres: K-pop; R&B; Ballad; Pop; Dance-pop
- Labels: Jellyfish Entertainment, CJ E&M Music and Live
- Producer: Hwang Se-jun (executive)

Seo In-guk chronology
Take#1 - Vol. 3 (2011)	Y.Bird from Jellyfish Island (2013)

VIXX chronology
Hyde/Jekyll (2012)	Y.BIRD from Jellyfish Island with VIXX & OKDAL (2013)	Voodoo (2013)

Singles from Y.Bird from Jellyfish Island
- 1. "The Beginning of Love" Released: June 14, 2012; 2. "I Can't Live Because of You" Released: February 4, 2013; 3. "Girls, Why?" Released: October 11, 2013; 4. "Blossom Tears" Released: August 5, 2014

Y.BIRD from Jellyfish Island is a series of periodically released single albums, created by Jellyfish Entertainment's CEO Hwang Se-jun for the purpose of showing the different sides of their artists to the public. Jellyfish Entertainment artists who have participated in the project so far have been Lee Seok Hoon, Seo In-guk, VIXX and VIXX member Leo.

== Singles ==
=== Y.Bird from Jellyfish Island with Lee Seok Hoon ===
Y.Bird from Jellyfish Island with Lee Seok Hoon by SG Wannabe member Lee Seok-hoon. It was released on June 14, 2012, under the Jellyfish Entertainment label and was the first in the Y.Bird from Jellyfish Island project.

=== Y.BIRD from Jellyfish Island With Seo In Guk ===
"Y.BIRD from Jellyfish Island With Seo In Guk" is the eighth digital single by South Korean singer, Seo In-guk. The single was released on February 4, 2013, containing the title track "I Can't Live Because of You" featuring Verbal Jint. "I Can't Live Because of You" tops various online charts upon its release including Bugs, Cyworld and Soribada.

On January 30, 2012, aphoto of Seo in recording studio spread in the internet gaining interest of fans. It was then reported that he will indeed release a new track soon. On February 4, the single was released digitally and features Verbal Jint.

The teaser for the music video was uploaded through Jellyfish Entertainment's official YouTube account. The full music video was released on the same day of the single's release.

=== Y.BIRD from Jellyfish Island with VIXX & OKDAL ===
Y.BIRD from Jellyfish Island with VIXX & OKDAL is a special collaborative single album by the South Korean boy band VIXX and indie pop duo OKDAL. It was released on October 11, 2013, under the Jellyfish Entertainment label. It features the title track "Girls, Why?".

On October 2, a press release from VIXX's promoter, Lune Communication confirmed that VIXX would be releasing a special collaboration album with female indie pop group OKDAL on the 11th.

The music video was released on VIXX's official YouTube channel on October 10, the day before the album came out.

The special single album contains two songs and one instrumental, OKDAL members Kim Yoon-ju and Park Sae-jin were the principal producers for the album. The title track "Girls, Why" (Korean: 여자는 왜) was written by Kim Yoon-ju save for the rap, which was written by Ravi. Both Yoon-ju and Sae-jin participated in composing the second song "I'm a Boy, You're a Girl". Ravi accompanied both OKDAL members in writing the lyrics.

VIXX and OKDAL promoted the special album with live performances on KBS2's You Hee-yeol's Sketchbook music program, which aired October 12 and at Jellyfish's Y.BIRD from Jellyfish Island Showcase on October 13.

=== Y.BIRD from Jellyfish with LYn X Leo ===
Y.BIRD from Jellyfish with LYn X Leo is a special collaborative single album by VIXX member Leo and LYn. It was released on August 5, 2014, under the Jellyfish Entertainment label. It features the title track "Blossom Tears" (Korean: 꽃잎놀이). It is the fourth single in the project series. In the haunting music video, Leo played a psychopath who killed the women he loved so that he could keep them. It is a heartbreaking and a fatal love story about a woman waiting for her one love, a man with a sad fate.

== Track listing ==
Y.Bird from Jellyfish Island with Lee Seok Hoon
No.	Title	Length
1.	"The Beginning of Love"	3:28
2.	"The Beginning of Love" (Inst.)	3:24

Y.BIRD from Jellyfish Island With Seo In Guk
No.	Title	Lyrics	Music	Arrangement	Length
1.	"I Can't Live Because of You" (feat. Verbal Jint)	Min Yeon-jae, Verbal Jint	Hwang Sejun, Kim Do-hoon	Kim Do-hoon	3:36
2.	"I Can't Live Because of You" (Inst.)		Hwang Sejun, Kim Do-hoon	Kim Do-hoon	3:36

Y.BIRD from Jellyfish Island With VIXX & OKDAL
No.	Title	Lyrics	Music	Length
1.	"Girls, Why?" (여자는 왜; Yeojaneun Wae)	Kim Yoon-ju, Ravi	Kim Yoon-ju	03:33
2.	"I'm a Boy, You're a Girl"	Ravi, Kim Yoon-ju, Park Sae-jin	Kim Yoon-ju, Park Sae-jin	03:00
3.	"Girls, Why?" (Inst.)		Kim Yoon-ju	03:33

Y.BIRD from Jellyfish with LYn X Leo
No.	Title	Lyrics	Music	Length
1.	"Blossom Tears" (꽃잎놀이; Kkoch-ipnol-i) (Translation: "Petal Play")	LYn	LYn	3:38
2.	"Blossom Tears" (Inst.)		LYn	3:38

== Release history ==
Single	Region	Format	Date	Label
Y.Bird from Jellyfish Island with Lee Seok Hoon	South Korea, worldwide	digital download	June 14, 2012	Jellyfish Entertainment
Y.BIRD from Jellyfish Island With Seo In Guk	South Korea, worldwide	digital download	4 February 2013	Jellyfish Entertainment
Y.BIRD from Jellyfish Island With VIXX & OKDAL	South Korea, worldwide	digital download	October 11, 2013	Jellyfish Entertainment
Y.BIRD from Jellyfish with LYn X Leo	South Korea, worldwide	digital download	August 5, 2014	Jellyfish Entertainment

== Chart performance ==
Year	Title	Peak position	Album	Sales (DL)
Year	Title	KOR Gaon	Album	Sales (DL)
2012	"The Beginning of Love"	32	Y.Bird from Jellyfish Island with Lee Seok Hoon	KOR: 265,043+
2013	"I Can't Live Because of You"	4	Y.BIRD from Jellyfish Island With Seo In Guk	KOR: 756,079+
2013	"Girls, Why?"	57	Y.BIRD from Jellyfish Island With VIXX & OKDAL	KOR: 74,225+
2014	"Blossom Tears"	11	Y.BIRD from Jellyfish with LYn X Leo	KOR: 156,798+
