= Ken (South Korean singer) =

South Korean singer

- Ken in 2024
- Born: Lee Jae-hwan; April 6, 1992 (age 34); Seoul, South Korea
- Education: Baekseok Arts University
- Occupations: Singer; actor
- Musical career
- Genres: K-pop; dance
- Instruments: Vocals; keyboards
- Years active: 2012–present
- Labels: S27M; Jellyfish (until 2024)
- Member of: VIXX

Korean name
- Hangul: 이재환
- RR: I Jaehwan
- MR: I Chaehwan

Lee Jae-hwan (Korean: 이재환 born April 6, 1992), known professionally as Ken (Korean: 켄), is a South Korean singer and actor, formerly signed under Jellyfish Entertainment. He is one of the members of the South Korean boy group VIXX, and has been widely praised for his unique, soulful, and husky vocal tone. Ken began his acting career in 2014 in MBC Every 1's comedy drama Boarding House No. 24 as Lee Jae-hwan.

== Early life ==
Born April 6, 1992, in Jayang-dong, Seoul, South Korea. He studied at Baekseok Arts University majoring in Practical Music. At a young age, he entered and won many singing competitions at local festivals. He later performed and won more singing competitions in middle school as part of a team with his friends prior to debuting with VIXX.

== Career ==
=== 2012–2013: Debut with VIXX and OSTs ===
Despite lacking experience in dance, Ken was able to pass his audition to Jellyfish Entertainment because of his singing where he trained for five months before debuting with VIXX. During this time, Ken was one of ten trainees who were contestants in Mnet's survival reality show MyDOL and was chosen to be a part of the final line-up and the 6-member boy group VIXX finally debuted with "Super Hero" on May 24, 2012 on M! Countdown.

In 2013, Ken contributed to The Heirs OST with "In the Name of Love" (Korean: 사랑이라는 이름으로). He was also featured with J'Kyun on the song "Ponytail".

In 2013, Ken made a cameo appearance in episode four of SBS' television drama The Heirs alongside his group members.

=== 2014–2015: Acting debut, Gap and musical theatre debut ===
In 2014, Ken contributed to another soundtrack for the You Are My Destiny OST with the song "My Girl".

In 2014, the singer landed his first acting role as a main cast member in the television comedy drama MBC Every 1's Boarding House No. 24 as Lee Jae-hwan.

On June 24, 2015, Ken and Hani released a duet called "Gap".

In 2015, Ken was cast in the musical Chess in the lead role of Anatoly Sergievsky, a world champion chess player from June 19, 2015, to July 19, 2015, at the Sejong Grand Theater in Seoul. For the role, he had to sing at a lower register, a sharp contrast from the high notes that predominantly appear in VIXX's music. His powerful vocals were showcased in the music video for one of the songs, "Anthem". He also appeared in Chinese singer Lu Yu's music video "The Fourth Dimension Love" as a former boyfriend. A big fan of VIXX, the singer had personally offered the role to Ken who accepted.

In 2015 Ken landed his second musical role in the first Korean production of the musical Cinderella in the lead role of Prince Christopher from September 12, 2015, to January 3, 2016, at the Chungmu Art Hall, Grand Theater in Seoul and Seongnam Arts Center Opera House.

=== 2016–2023: Solo activities and musical theatre ===
In February 2016, Ken contributed to the Moorim School OST with the song "When I See You" (Korean: 그댈 보면). On May 24, it was announced that Ken would be collaborating with Mystic Entertainment's Yoon Jong-shin on his monthly collaboration project, Melody Monthly. The project which has included artists like Seventeen's vocal unit and Epik High's Tablo, the single "Over Sleep" was released on May 30, 2016. On December 22, 2016, Ken contributed to The Legend of the Blue Sea soundtrack with the song "Fool" (Korean: 바보야).

In 2017, Ken was cast in three musicals: Tsukasa Domyouji in Boys Over Flowers the Musical, Hamlet in Hamlet, and as Frederick Barrett in the Titanic the Musical. Ken received the Rookie of the Year award at the 12th Daegu International Musical Festival for his work in Hamlet.

In 2018, Ken played in the musical Iron Mask as Louis and his twin Philip. On December 25, 2018, it was announced that Ken joined the cast of an upcoming musical Jack the Ripper as Daniel. In the same year, Ken also appeared in the web drama Tofu Personified.

On April 15, 2019, Ken joins a new musical "Mefisto" in a lead role scheduled to run from May 25 to July 28. In the same year, Ken also played Dracula in Dracula the musical.

On May 20, 2020, Ken made his solo debut with his first EP "Greeting", with its lead single "Just For A Moment".

On July 6, 2020, Ken enlisted in the South Korean military, where he joined the military band. He was discharged on January 5, 2022.

Following his discharge, Ken returned to musical theatre as Arthur in Xcalibur in 2022. He also portrayed Park Yeol in 22 Years 2 Months theatre.

=== 2024–present: Departure from Jellyfish Entertainment and solo activities ===
On March 3, 2024, Jellyfish Entertainment announced that Ken and fellow VIXX member Leo were leaving the agency, but continue their activities with VIXX. In July of the same year, Ken signed an exclusive contract with S27M Entertainment.

On August 23, 2024, Ken released Consolation & Love, a gift album prepared for his fans. The album featured "To You" and "Love Day" and was distributed in KiT album format. In October, Ken became the host of the web variety shows YES I KEN, which was his debut into web show hosting world.

In December 2024, he appeared as Phoebus in the musical Notre-Dame de Paris. Later that month, he began appearing in Ghost Bakery musical.

Ken also released Puzzle, his second extended play, on December 26, 2024. Led by the single "Gradually", the album explored rock-influenced sounds and marked a departure from his earlier ballad-focused releases.

In 2025, Ken played Charlie in the musical Kinky Boots. He also participated in the fifth season of SBS's music variety series The Listen as a cast member.. In September 23, Ken released RE:BORN as a KiT album. In November, Ken became the host for web variety program Talent Design School in which he helped guests develop personal talents and performance skills.

In 2026, Ken reunited with VIXX for the group's Case No. VIXX fan concert in Seoul, marking the group's return to full-group activities after 7 years. On April 2026, Ken held a solo fan concert 사월, 봄 내음이 스치던 순간... 별의 조각이 찾아왔다 in Seoul.

In 2025 and 2026, Ken continued performing at music festivals and live events as a solo artist alongside his musical-theatre and variety-show activities.

In May 2026, he portrayed Lee Chae-rok in the musical version of Navillera. Through his performances in Kinky Boots and Navillera, he received the Star of the Year award at the 20th Daegu International Musical Festival in the same year. He was also appointed a promotional ambassador for the 2026 Gyeonggi University Musical Festival. In July, Ken played Neil Perry in the musical Dead Poets Society.

On November 4, 2026, Ken's agency, S27M Entertainment, announced that he would release his upcoming album, 1X5, on November 17, 2026. On November 8, 2026, it was announced that Ken would hold a solo concert 1X5: ALL OF ME on December 24–25, 2026 at XSCALA. On November 17, 2026, it was announced that Ken had been cast in the musical Extraordinary Attorney Woo that will run from January to February 2027.

== Discography ==
=== Extended plays ===
Title	Details	Peak chart positions	Sales
Title	Details	KOR	Sales
Greeting	Released: May 20, 2020; Label: Jellyfish Entertainment; Formats: CD, digital download, streaming; Track listing: 1. "Just for a Moment" (10분이라도 더 보려고); 2. "To Us Who Have to Endure" (견뎌야 하는 우리에게; with Monday Kiz); 3. "With All My Heart" (진심으로 갈게); 4. "Meteor Shower" (유성우); 5. "So Romantic"; 6. "Just for a Moment" (10분이라도 더 보려고; Inst.)	5	KOR: 19,906
Puzzle	Released: December 26, 2024; Label: S27M Entertainment; Formats: CD, digital download, streaming; Track listing: 1. "Gradually" (시나브로); 2. "Bye My Only Universe"; 3. "We Are Forever" (이 밤이 지나도); 4. "Make Me Strong"; 5. "Dear Little Star"	7	KOR: 20,500

=== Singles ===
Title	Year	Peak chart position	Sales	Album
Title	Year	KOR	Sales	Album
As lead artist
"Just For A Moment" (10분이라도 더 보려고)	2020	—	—N/a	Greeting
"To Us Who Have to Endure" (견뎌야 하는 우리에게; with Monday Kiz)	2020	—	—N/a	Greeting
"Greeting" (하나하나 세어본다)	2020	—	—N/a	Non-album singles
"Gradually"	2024	—	—N/a	Puzzle
"The Wind Blows"	2025	—	—N/a	Non-album singles
"Love Day"	2025	—	—N/a	Consolation & Love
"To You" (너에게)	2025	—	—N/a	Consolation & Love
"That Spring, That Memory"	2025	—	—N/a	KEN X Lulu-lala Friends
"When I Hold You In My Arms"	2025	—	—N/a	The Listen: Reaching You
"A Flying Butterfly"	2026	—	—N/a	Re:Born
"Heart"	2026	—	—N/a	Re:Born
"Higher Now"	2026	TBA	TBA	1X5
"소행성 한 조각의 이야기"	2026	TBA	TBA	1X5
Collaborations
"Ponytail" (with J'Kyun)	2013	93	KOR (DL): 21,644+	Non-album singles
"Gap" (with Hani of EXID)	2015	25	KOR (DL): 92,982+	Non-album singles
"Over Sleep" (with Yoon Jong-shin) (Note: "Over Sleep" was a promotional tool for Yoon Jong-shin's 2016 Melody Monthly Project for the month of May.)	2016	— (Note: "Over Sleep" did not enter the Gaon Digital Chart, but peaked at number 35 on the Gaon Social Chart.)	—N/a	Non-album singles
"The Late Regret" (with Kim Hyung Suk)	2018	—	—N/a	Kim Hyung Suk with Friends
"Old Song" (with Youngjae, Hui, Choi Sang-yeop)	2025	—	—N/a	Non-album singles
"Shiny Star(The Listen 5)" (with Huh Gak, Kwon Jin-ah, Ash Island, Big Naughty, Bang Ye-dam, Jeong Sang-keun, #Annyeong)	2025	—	—N/a	Non-album singles
"Radio" (with Yoonseok)	2026	—	—N/a	Non-album singles
Original soundtracks
"In The Name of Love" (사랑이라는 이름으로)	2013	72	KOR (DL): 29,986+	The Heirs OST Part 3
"My Girl"	2014	73	KOR (DL): 23,205+	You Are My Destiny OST Part 5
"When I See You" (그댈 보면)	2016	—	—N/a	Moorim School OST Part 4
"Fool" (바보야)	2016	78	KOR (DL): 44,708+	The Legend of The Blue Sea OST Part 7
"What do you want?" (뭘 원해?)	2018	—	—N/a	Tofu Personified OST Part. 2
"I'll Meet You" (나랑 만나볼래요)	2018	—	—N/a	My Strange Hero OST Part 1
"My Blood is Blue" (내 피는 파랑)	2022	—	—N/a	Human Court Musical OST
"You're My Love Girl"	2022	—	—N/a	May I Help You? OST Part. 3
"Jasmine" (말리꽃)	2023	—	—N/a	Into My Playlist Pt. 3
"Love me Again"	2024	—	—N/a	This is a Campus Romance Webtoon Series OST
As a featured artist
"Rose" (Ravi featuring Ken of VIXX)	2017	—	—N/a	R.eal1ze
"On My Way" (Yoon Seok featuring Ken of VIXX)	2019	—	—N/a	Non-album singles
"Different Night" (Moon Jong-up featuring GODOK, Ken)	2024	—	—N/a	Peter
"—" denotes releases that did not chart or were not released in that region.

=== Songwriting credits ===
All song credits are adapted from the Korea Music Copyright Association's database unless stated otherwise.

Year	Song	Album	Artist	Role
2018	"Navy & Shining Gold"	Eau De VIXX	VIXX	Composer
2019	"On My Way"	On My Way	Yoon Seok	Lyricist and composer
2020	"Meteor Shower" (유성우)	Greeting (인사)	Ken	Composer
2020	"Greeting" (하나하나 세어본다)	Greeting (하나하나 세어본다)	Ken	Lyricist
2024	"Dear Little Star"	PUZZLE	Ken	Lyricist

== Filmography ==
=== Television series ===
Year	Title	Role	Notes	Ref.
2014	The Heirs	Himself	Cameo ep. 4	
2014	Boarding House No. 24	Lee Jaehwan		
2016	Entertainer	The Show Special MC	Cameo	

=== Web series ===
Year	Title	Role	Ref.
2018	Tofu Personified	Kim Joo-heon	
2025	Looped in Love and Death	Min Jun	

=== Television shows ===
Year	Title	Role	Notes	Ref.
2015	100 People, 100 Songs	Contestant		
2015	King of Mask Singer	Contestant	as "Cracked Egg and Noodles" (Episode 11–12)	
2016	Duet Song Festival	Contestant	with Choi Sang-yeob (Episode 3-7 & 16–17)	
2019	King of Mask Singer	Contestant	as "Metal Boy" (Episode 187–188)	
2022	2022 DIMF Musical Star	Judge		
2025	Lululala Friend with Japan	Cast member		
2025	The Listen: Reaching You	Cast member		

=== Web shows ===
Year	Title	Role	Notes	Ref.
2024	YES I KEN	Host	Airing on the 별별별 Studio YouTube channel	
2025-26	Talent Design School (개인기 디자인 스쿨)	Host	Airing on 스브스뉴스 SUBUSUNEWS YouTube Channel	
2026	Ken, the chief of good deeds (선행부장 켄)	Host	Airing exclusively on 편집실 두더지들 (The Editing Room Moles) YouTube channel	

== Musicals & plays ==
Year	Title	Role	Notes	Ref.
2015	Chess	Anatoly Sergievsky	Korean version	
2015-16	Cinderella	Prince Christopher	Korean version	
2017	Boys Over Flowers The Musical	Tsukasa Domyouji	Korean musical version	
2017	Hamlet	Hamlet	Korean version	
2017	Titanic	Frederick Barrett	Korean version	
2018	The Man in the Iron Mask	King Louis XIV/Philippe	Korean version	
2018-19	Sonata of a Flame	Composer S		
2019	Jack the Ripper	Daniel	Korean version	
2019	Mefisto	Mefisto	Korean version	
2019	Dracula	Dracula	Korean version	
2020	Sherlock Holmes The Musical: The Lost Children	Clive Owen	Korean version	
2022	Xcalibur	Arthur	Korean version	
2022	Human Court	Robot Ao		
2023	22 Years 2 Months	Park Yeol		
2024	Notre-Dame de Paris	Phoebus	Korean version	
2024	Ghost Bakery	Ghost		
2025-26	Kinky Boots	Charlie	Korean version	
2026	Navillera	Lee Chae-rok	Musical version	
2026	Dead Poets Society	Neil Perry	Korean version	
2027	Extraordinary Attorney Woo	Lee Joon-ho	Musical version	

== Concerts & live performances ==
Year	Title	City	Country	Location	Ref.
2019	HAPPY KEN DAY［I KEN DO IT]	Seoul	South Korea	SMTOWN@coexartium	
2020	KEN Ontact LIVE '인사'	Live online streaming on NAVER VLIVE+			
2023	HAPPY KEN DAY #쟌2뭐해?	Seoul	South Korea	Yonsei University Centennial Hall Concert Hall	
2024	2024 KEN FAN CONCERT [749번째 고백 - My love, My destiny]	Seoul	South Korea	YES24 Live Hall	
2024	2024 KEN FAN CONCERT [749번째 고백 - My love, My destiny]	Taipei	Taiwan	WESTAR	
2025	2025 KEN SOLO CONCERT: WONDER LAND	Seoul	South Korea	Blue Square Mastercard Hall	
2025	2025 KEN SOLO CONCERT: WONDER LAND	Taipei	Taiwan	Clapper Studio	
2025	2025 KEN FAN CONCERT 일구구RE: 재환 일대기	Seoul	South Korea	Ewha Womans University Samsung Hall	
2026	2026 KEN FAN CONCERT '사월, 봄 내음이 스치던 순간... 별의 조각이 찾아왔다'	Seoul	South Korea	XSCALA	
2026	2026 KEN CONCERT '1X5: ALL OF ME'	Seoul	South Korea	XSCALA	

=== Festival solo stage performances ===
Year	Title	City	Country	Location	Ref.
2025	Someday Festival 2025	Seoul	South Korea	88 Lawn Park	
2025	2025 Sound Planet Festival	Incheon	South Korea	Paradise City	
2025	2025 Yeosu K-Mega Island Festival (KMIF)	Yeosu	South Korea	Yeosu Expo	
2025	Rolling 30th Anniversary Concert	Seoul	South Korea	Rolling Hall	
2025	Grand Mint Festival 2025	Seoul	South Korea	Olympic Park	
2025	Wonderland Festival 2025	Seoul	South Korea	Grand Peace Palace at Kyung Hee University	
2026	2026 Sound Planet Festival	Incheon	South Korea	Paradise City	
2026	2026 A+ Festival	Seoul	South Korea	Magok Square	

== Awards and nominations ==
Year	Award	Category	Nominated work	Result	Ref.
2018	12th Daegu International Musical Festival	Rookie of the Year - Male	Hamlet	Won	
2026	20th Daegu International Musical Festival	Star of the Year	Kinky Boots, Navillera	Won	

== Honors and titles ==
Year	Appointing body	Title	Ref.
2026	2026 Gyeonggi University Musical Festival (GUMF)	3rd promotional ambassador	
