= Rooftop Moonlight =

South Korean music duo

Rooftop Moonlight(옥상달빛)
- Also known as: Okdal
- Origin: Seoul, South Korea
- Genres: Indie; folk; ballad
- Years active: 2010–present
- Label: WOWSANRECORD
- Members: Kim Yoon-ju; Park Se-jin
- Website: www.msbsound.com

- Korean name
- Hangul: 옥상달빛
- Lit.: Rooftop Moonlight
- RR: Oksangdalbit
- MR: Oksangdalpit

Rooftop Moonlight (Korean: 옥상달빛; also known as Okdal) is a South Korean duo formed by Magic Strawberry Sound in Seoul, South Korea. They debuted on January 22, 2010, with Okdal Radio.

== Career ==
Rooftop Moonlight was formed when they were students of video music composition at Dong-ah Institute of Media and Arts and has been performing since 2008 with the modern rock club. By participating in the third album of Old Fish, the two took their first step toward becoming musicians.

Later, while receiving attention for winning the 19th Yoo Jae-ha Music Competition, documentary and film music participation, it became widely known for its song "Rooftop Moonlight," which was inserted in the drama Pasta.

Since their official debut in the music industry with EP album "Rooftop Radio" in 2010, they have gained popularity with reviews that they express the sensibilities of contemporary youth in detail.

On 26 April 2011, they released their first album, 28. With the title track "None The Better Or Courage," they showed more arrangements and compositions than EPs. In the same year, they successfully sold out their first solo performance, "merit of solo," on June 3–5.

== Members ==
- Kim Yoon-ju (김윤주) – vocal, keyboard, guitar
- Park Se-jin (박세진) – vocal, melodica, xylophone

== Discography ==
=== Studio albums ===
Title	Album details	Peak chart positions	Sales
Title	Album details	KOR	Sales
28	Released: April 26, 2011; Label: Poclanos; Formats: CD, digital download	—	—N/a
Where	Released: May 6, 2013; Label: Magic Strawberry Sound, Poclanos; Formats: CD, digital download	10	KOR: 2,351

=== Extended plays ===
Title	Album details	Peak chart positions	Sales
Title	Album details	KOR	Sales
Okdal Radio (옥탑라됴)	Released: January 22, 2010; Label: Poclanos; Formats: CD, digital download	—	—N/a
Each Other (서로)	Released: May 3, 2012; Label: Magic Strawberry Sound, Poclanos; Formats: CD, digital download	—	—N/a
RE:Tag	Released: May 13, 2016; Label: Magic Strawberry Sound, Poclanos; Formats: CD, digital download	—	—N/a
Day / Night	Released: January 3, 2019; Label: Magic Strawberry Sound, Genie Music; Formats: CD, digital download	66	—N/a
Still a Child	Released: July 24, 2020; Label: Magic Strawberry Sound, Genie Music; Formats: CD, digital download	—	—N/a

=== Single albums ===
Title	Album details	Peak chart positions	Sales
Title	Album details	KOR	Sales
Y.BIRD from Jellyfish Island With VIXX & OKDAL	Released: October 11, 2013; Label: Jellyfish Entertainment, CJ E&M; Formats: CD, digital download	4	KOR: 9,156
The Strange Times (희한한 시대)	Released: May 7, 2015; Label: Magic Strawberry Sound, Poclanos; Formats: CD, digital download	17	—N/a
Mon/Fri (월월월월금)	Released: April 6, 2017; Label: Magic Strawberry Sound, Poclanos; Formats: CD, digital download	36	—N/a

=== Singles ===
Title	Year	Peak chart positions	Sales (DL)	Album
Title	Year	KOR	Sales (DL)	Album
"Okdal" (옥상달빛)	2010	—	—N/a	Okdal Radio
"A-Live" (하드코어 인생아)	2010	—	—N/a	Non-album single
"None The Better Or Courage" (없는게 메리트)	2011	89	KOR: 70,514	28
"Bird" feat. Yoo Se-yoon	2012	—	—N/a	Each Other
"Gift" (선물할게)	2012	84	KOR: 96,523	Each Other
"Newness" (새로와)	2013	81	KOR: 41,657	Where
"It's Okay" (괜찮습니다)	2013	67	KOR: 47,831	Where
"Hero" (히어로)	2013	—	—N/a	Where
"Remember" (기억하는지) feat. Lee Young-hoon	2013	—	—N/a	Magic Strawberry Sound Compilation Vol.1 (I am your composer)
"Enchante (Nice to Meet You)" (Enchante (만나서 반가워요))	2014	—	—N/a	Non-album singles
"Sometimes It's Okay" (가끔은 그래도 괜찮아)	2014	99	KOR: 25,916	Non-album singles
"Thank You Again" (또 고마워서 만든 노래)	2014	—	—N/a	Non-album singles
"The Strange Times" (희한한 시대)	2015	—	—N/a	The Strange Times
"Wanna Disappear" (내가 사라졌으면 좋겠어)	2015	—	—N/a	The Strange Times
"Run (Note: A cover of 2002 song Running by s.e.s which was a cover of the song with the same title from 1995 album Golden hit by group nodance, which Yoon Sang and Shin Hae-chul was part of.)" (달리기)	2015	—	—N/a	RE:Tag
"The Lover" (Note: Cover of the song from Sung Si-kyung's 2005 album I Want to Dream Again) (두 사람)	2016	—	—N/a	RE:Tag
"Walk" (걸어가자)	2016	—	—N/a	RE:Tag
"Sketchbook" (스케치북)	2016	—	—N/a	RE:Tag
"Intern" (인턴)	2017	—	KOR: 21,576	Mon/Fri
"Coming of Age" (어른이 될 시간)	2017	—	—N/a	Non-album single
"The Best Days" (청춘길일(靑春吉日))	2018	—	—N/a	Day / Night
"Life on Stage" (직업병)	2018	—	—N/a	Day / Night
"Balance" (발란스)	2018	—	—N/a	Day / Night
"Nights" (밤밤밤)	2018	—	—N/a	Day / Night
"Beautiful as you are" (그대로도 아름다운 너에게)	2019	—	—N/a	Non-album singles
"Good Night"	2019	—	—N/a	Non-album singles
"Take a stroll" (산책의 미학)	2020	—	—N/a	Still a Child
"Looks like an adult" (어른처럼 생겼네)	2020	—	—N/a	Still a Child
"—" denotes releases that did not chart.

=== Collaborations ===
Title	Year	Album	Other artist(s)
"Girls, Why?" (여자는 왜)	2013	Y.BIRD from Jellyfish Island With VIXX & OKDAL	VIXX
"1015"	2013	Magic Strawberry Sound Compilation Vol.1 (I am your composer)	K.AFKA
"Thinking About You" (좋은 생각이 났어, 니 생각)	2016	Non-album single	Ha Sang-wook
"Heart Song" (마음으로 부르는 노래)	2017	A song that I sing with my heart	Ahn Ye-eun, Kwon Soon Kwan, Jo So Jung, Hello Ga-Young, Sunwoo Jung-a, Jo Min Hwi, Lee Seol Ah, Jo Ye Ran

=== Soundtrack appearances ===
Title	Year	Peak chart positions	Sales (DL)	Album
Title	Year	KOR	Sales (DL)	Album
"Cocktail Love" (칵테일 사랑) with Shinjae (Note: Cover of the 1994 song cocktail love by Maronnier.)	2012	96	KOR: 77,776	I Need Romance 2012 OST
"It Happens" (그럴 수 있잖아)	2014	—	—N/a	Miss Korea OST
"My Love Song" (내 사랑의 노래)	2015	92	KOR: 25,261	The Time We Were Not in Love OST
"Will I Be Able To Leave" (떠날 수 있을까타이틀)	2016	—	—N/a	Drinking Solo OST
"LaLaLa"	2019	—	—N/a	BTS World Original Soundtrack OST
"Good Luck" (행운을 빌어요)	2019	—	—N/a	Miss Lee OST
"Each Other" (서로)	2020	—	—N/a	More Than Friends OST Special
"Say hello to me" (당신의 안녕)	2020	—	—N/a	Hush OST Part.1
"—" denotes releases that did not chart.

=== Other appearances ===
Title	Year	Peak chart positions	Album
Title	Year	KOR	Album
"Out of remedy" (구제불능)	2010	—	MINTPAPER project album vol.3 LIFE
"Red velvet"	2011	—	SAVe tHE AiR GREEN CONCERT
"Life" (삶)	2014	—	Found Tracks Vol.43
"The Seashore Village" (갯마을)	2015	—	Music, Choi Seung-ho's rap rap rap
"Stupid Groom, Crybaby Bride" (바보 신랑, 울보 각시)	2015	—	Music, Choi Seung-ho's rap rap rap
"Beep Beep Beep" (빕빕빕)	2018	—	Non-album single
"Finding you" (님 찾아가는 길)	2019	—	The Road to Nim (MBC Radio's theme song for the '100th Anniversary Special Planning of the Provisional Government of Korea')
"A letter to the heart" (마음에 쓰는 편지)	2019	—	MBC'Will you be number one now?' Part.4
"—" denotes releases that did not chart.
