= Eternity (VIXX song) =

Single by VIXX
- B-side: "Sad Ending"; "Love LaLaLa"
- Released: May 27, 2014
- Recorded: 2014
- Genre: K-pop, electronic, dance-pop
- Length: 13:00
- Label: Jellyfish Entertainment
- Songwriters: Kim Eana, Ravi
- Producers: Hyuk Shin, Deanfluenza, 2xxx!, DK, siyeonking!

VIXX singles chronology
"Voodoo" (2013)	"Eternity" (2014)	"Darkest Angels" (2014)

Music videos
- "Eternity" on YouTube
- "Eternity" (dance version) on YouTube

"Eternity" (Korean: 기적; RR: Gijeok; lit. "Miracle") is a single recorded by South Korean idol group VIXX. It was released physically and as a digital single on May 27, 2014, through Jellyfish Entertainment. "Eternity" was written by lyricist Kim Eana, who also wrote VIXX's last four title tracks. The song's lyrics portray the fantasy of time, and is about the miracle of love that exists in the moment and forever.

The song's music video was directed by Hong Won-ki of ZanyBros, who directed most of their previous music videos.

== Background and release ==
On May 18, VIXX announced that they would be coming back with their fourth single album "Eternity" through a post on their official fancafe. They also revealed their teaser for the single in the way of a real-time countdown timer on their official website. The timer is fashioned after an old-time pocket watch clock face.

=== Concept ===
A Jellyfish Entertainment representative explained, "The concept of VIXX’s 4th single album 'Eternity' is a miraculous love story happening in a moment and time called forever, through 'the fantasy of time'." "VIXX's 4th single album concept is a 'time fantasy' and expresses the miraculous love story that happens in the present and for eternity."

== Composition ==
"Eternity" was written by award-winning songwriter Kim Eana, with the rap being written by Ravi. The song was composed by Shin Hyuk, Deanfluenza, 2xxx!, DK and siyeonking! and arranged by 2xxx! The second track "Sad Ending" was composed and arranged by Swedish producers Erik Lidbom and Jon Hallgren, with lyrics written by Lee Seu Lan of Jam Factory and Ravi. The third track "Love, LaLaLa" was composed and arranged by MELODESIGN, Keeproots & fascinating. It was written by Kim Ji-hyang, MELODESIGN and Ravi.

== Track listing ==
The credits are adapted from the official homepage of the group.

No.	Title	Lyrics	Music	Length
1.	"Eternity" (기적; Gijeok)	Kim Eana	Hyuk Shin, Deanfluenza, 2xxx!, DK, siyeonking!	3:04
2.	"Sad Ending"	Lee Seu Lan (Jam Factory), Ravi	Erik Lidbom, Jon Hallgren	3:16
3.	"Love, LaLaLa"	Kim Ji Hyang, MELODESIGN, Ravi	MELODESIGN, Keeproots, fascinating	3:32
4.	"Eternity" (Inst.)		Hyuk Shin, Deanfluenza, 2xxx!, DK, siyeonking!	3:04
Total length:				13:00

== Charts ==
Chart	Peak position
South Korea (Gaon Singles Chart)	7
South Korea (Gaon Monthly Singles Chart)	57
South Korea (Gaon Weekly Mobile Ringtone Chart)	40
South Korea (Gaon Social Chart)	2
South Korea (Gaon Weekly albums chart)	1
South Korea (Gaon Monthly albums chart)	4
Billboard (Korea K-Pop Hot 100)	25
Billboard (US World)	3

== Awards and nominations ==
=== Awards ===
Year	Award	Nominated work	Result
Mnet Asian Music Awards
2014	Best Dance Performance - Male Group	"Eternity"	Nominated
2014	Song of the Year	"Eternity"	Nominated
Golden Disk Awards
2015	Disk Bonsang Award	Eternity	Won
2015	Digital Bonsang Award	"Eternity"	Nominated
Gaon Chart Music Awards
2015	2nd Quarter Best Selling Record Award	"Eternity"	Nominated

=== Music program awards ===
Song	Music show	Date
"Eternity"	Inkigayo	June 8, 2014
"Eternity"	Show Champion	June 11, 2014

== Release history ==
Region	Date	Format	Label
South Korea	May 27, 2014	CD; Digital download	Jellyfish Entertainment; CJ E&M Music
Worldwide	May 27, 2014	Digital download	Jellyfish Entertainment

== See also ==
- List of Gaon Album Chart number ones of 2014
