= On and On (VIXX song) =

2013 song by VIXX

Single by VIXX
- B-side: "Don't Want to Be an Idol"
- Released: January 17, 2013
- Recorded: 2013
- Genre: K-pop, synthpop, dance-pop
- Length: 11:00
- Label: Jellyfish Entertainment
- Songwriters: Kim Eana, Ravi
- Producers: Hwang Se-jun, Albi Albertsson, Ricky Hanley, Kirstine Lind

VIXX singles chronology
"Rock Ur Body" (2012)	"On and On" (2013)	"Hyde" (2013)

Music video
- "On and On" on YouTube

"On and On" (Korean: 다칠 준비가 돼 있어; RR: Dachil Junbiga Dwae Isseo; lit. "I'm Ready to Get Hurt") is a song recorded by South Korean idol group VIXX. It was released physically and as a digital single on January 17, 2013 through Jellyfish Entertainment. The song served as VIXX's third single. "On and On" was composed by Jellyfish Entertainment CEO Hwang Se-jun, Albi Albertsson, Ricky Hanley and Kirstine Lind. It was written by lyricist Kim Eana, with the rap being written by Ravi.

The song's music video was directed by Song Won Young.

== Release ==
The third single album, On and On was released on January 17.

== Track listing ==
The credits are adapted from the official homepage of the group.

No.	Title	Lyrics	Music	Length
1.	"On and On" (다칠 준비가 돼 있어; Dachil Junbiga Dwae Isseo)	Kim Eana, Ravi (rap)	Hwang Se-jun, Albi Albertsson, Ricky Hanley, Kirstine Lind	03:42
2.	"Don't Want to Be an Idol" (아이돌 하기 싫어; Aidol Haki Silheo)	Min Yeon Jae	Drew Ryan Scott, Alex Niceforo	03:45
3.	"On and On" (Inst.)		Hwang Se-jun, Albi Albertsson, Ricky Hanley, Kirstine Lind	03:42
Total length:				11:00

== Credits and personnel ==
- VIXX – vocals
  - Cha Hakyeon (N) – Lead vocals, background vocals
  - Jung Taekwoon (Leo) – Main vocals, background vocals
  - Lee Jaehwan (Ken) – Main vocals, background vocals
  - Kim Wonsik (Ravi) – rap, songwriting
  - Lee Hongbin – vocals
  - Han Sanghyuk (Hyuk) – vocals
- Kim Eana – songwriting
- Hwang Se Jun – producer, music
- Albi Albertsson – producer, music
- Ricky Hanley – producer, music
- Kristine Lind – producer, music

== Chart performance ==
Chart	Peak position
South Korea (Gaon Singles Chart)	25
South Korea (Gaon Monthly Singles chart)	87
South Korea (Gaon Social chart)	38
Billboard (Korea K-Pop Hot 100)	96

== Release history ==
Region	Date	Format	Label
South Korea	January 17, 2013	CD; Digital download	Jellyfish Entertainment; CJ E&M Music
Worldwide	January 17, 2013	Digital download	Jellyfish Entertainment
