= Super Hero (VIXX song) =

Single by VIXX
- B-side: "Starlight"
- Released: May 24, 2012
- Recorded: 2012
- Genre: K-pop, dance-pop
- Length: 3:30
- Label: Jellyfish Entertainment
- Songwriters: Kiggen, Ravi
- Producers: Kiggen, Brent Paschke, Jimmy Richard Drew

VIXX singles chronology
"Super Hero" (2012)	"Rock Ur Body" (2012)

Music video
- "Super Hero" on YouTube

"Super Hero" is the debut single by South Korean boy band VIXX. It was released as a physical album and as a digital single on May 24, 2012 through Jellyfish Entertainment.

== Composition ==
"Super Hero" was composed by rapper Kiggen (of the hip hop group Phantom), guitarist Brent Paschke and music producer Drew Ryan Scott. VIXX member Ravi wrote the raps for both the title track and B-side "Starlight."

== Promotions ==
The group started promoting on May 24 and they had their debut stage on Mnet's M! Countdown. They ended promotion for the album performing a remix of "Super Hero" in their goodbye stages from July 1 to July 13.

== Music video ==
The music video for "Super Hero" was directed by veteran k-pop music video director Hong Won-ki of Zanybros.

== Track listing ==
The credits are adapted from the official homepage of the group.

No.	Title	Lyrics	Music	Length
1.	"Super Hero"	Kiggen, Ravi (rap)	Kiggen, Brent Paschke, Jimmy Richard Drew	03:30
2.	"Starlight"	Jeong Hye Young, Ravi (rap)	Andreas Oberg, Erik Lidbom and Jona Nilsson	03:41
3.	"Super Hero" (Inst.)		Kiggen, Brent Paschke, Jimmy Richard Drew	03:30
Total length:				10:41

== Credits and personnel ==
- VIXX – vocals
  - Cha Hakyeon (N) – Lead vocals, background vocals
  - Jung Taekwoon (Leo) – Main vocals, background vocals
  - Lee Jaehwan (Ken) – Main vocals, background vocals
  - Kim Wonsik (Ravi) – rap, songwriting
  - Lee Hongbin – vocals
  - Han Sanghyuk (Hyuk) – vocals
- Kiggen – songwriting, producer, music
- Brent Paschke – producer, music
- Jimmy Richard Drew – producer, music

== Charts ==
=== Weekly charts ===
Chart (2012)	Peak position
South Korea (Gaon)	112
South Korean Albums (Gaon)	18

== Release history ==
Region	Date	Format	Label
South Korea	May 24, 2012	CD; Digital download	Jellyfish Entertainment; CJ E&M Music
Worldwide	May 24, 2012	Digital download	Jellyfish Entertainment
