= Hyde (EP) =

EP by VIXX
- Released: May 20, 2013; July 31, 2013 (Jekyll)
- Recorded: 2013
- Genre: K-pop
- Language: Korean
- Label: Jellyfish Entertainment

VIXX chronology
On and On (2013)	Hyde (2013)	Y.BIRD from Jellyfish Island With VIXX & OKDAL (2013)

Repackaged Album
- Jekyll (Repackaged Album)

Singles from Hyde
- 1. "Hyde" Released: May 20, 2013

Singles from Jekyll
- 1. "G.R.8.U" Released: July 31, 2013

Hyde is the first mini-album by the South Korean boy band VIXX. It was released on May 20, 2013, under Jellyfish Entertainment, and features the single of the same name. The album was re-released as Jekyll on July 31, 2013, with the single "G.R.8.U".

== Singles ==
=== "Hyde" ===
VIXX promoted Hyde with the song of the same name. The song's lyrics were written by songwriter Kim Eana, and the rap portion was written by Ravi. The music was composed by Jellyfish Entertainment CEO Hwang Se Jun and Swedish production team D30 (Caesar & Loui and Olof Lindskog). The song's music video was directed by Hong Won-ki of ZanyBros, who also directed their previous music videos, "Super Hero" and "Rock Ur Body".

Promotion began on May 23 on M! Countdown, and wrapped up with a goodbye stage on Inkigayo on June 30. The song peaked at number 35 on Gaon Singles Chart.

=== "G.R.8.U" ===
The lead single from Jekyll, "G.R.8.U" (Korean: 대.다.나.다.너; RR: Dae.da.na.da.neo), was written by Kim Eana and produced by Hyuk Shin, DK, Ross Lara and Todd Wright. The song's music video was directed by Hong Won-ki of ZanyBros. Promotion began on August 1, and wrapped up with a goodbye stage on Inkigayo on September 8. The song peaked at number 14 on Gaon Singles Chart.

== Track listing ==
The credits are adapted from the official homepage of the group.

Hyde
No.	Title	Lyrics	Music	Length
1.	"Light Me Up" (어둠 속을 밝혀줘; Eodum Sogeul Balkhyeojwo) (Translation: "Light Up the Darkness")	Ravi	Hyuk Shin, DK, Ross Lara	03:01
2.	"Hyde"	Kim Eana, Ravi (rap)	Hwang Se-jun, D30	03:16
3.	"You're Mine" (그만 버티고; Geuman Beotigo) (Translation: "Stop Resisting") (ft. Minah of Girl's Day)	Kim Ji-hyang, Ravi (rap)	MELODESIGN, Park Gyunghyun	03:45
4.	"CHAOS"	Kim Ji-hyang, MELODESIGN, Ravi (rap)	MELODESIGN	02:54
5.	"Love Letter"	Kim Ji-hyang, MELODESIGN	Hwang Se-jun, MELODESIGN	04:35
6.	"Hyde" (Inst.)		Hwang Se-jun, D30	03:16
Total length:				21:00

Jekyll - Repackaged version
No.	Title	Lyrics	Music	Length
1.	"Jekyll"		MELODESIGN	00:43
2.	"G.R.8.U" (대.다.나.다.너; Dae. Da.Na.Da.Neo) (Translation: "You. Are. Im.pressive")	Kim Eana	Hyuk Shin, DK, Ross Lara, Todd Wright	03:30
3.	"Say Love" (어떡하지; Eotteokhaji) (Translation: "What To Do" or "How")	AIS, Ravi	Michael McGarity, Theresa Houston	03:08
4.	"Light Me Up" (어둠 속을 밝혀줘; Eodum Sogeul Balkhyeojwo) (Translation: "Light Up the Darkness")	Ravi	Hyuk Shin, DK, Ross Lara	03:01
5.	"Hyde"	Kim Eana, Ravi (rap)	Hwang Se-jun, D30	03:16
6.	"You're Mine" (그만 버티고; Geuman Beotigo) (Translation: "Stop Resisting") (ft. Minah of Girl's Day)	Kim Ji-hyang, Ravi (rap)	MELODESIGN, Park Gyunghyun	03:45
7.	"CHAOS"	Kim Ji-hyang, MELODESIGN, Ravi (rap)	MELODESIGN	02:54
8.	"Love Letter"	Kim Ji-hyang, MELODESIGN	Hwang Se-jun, MELODESIGN	04:35
9.	"G.R.8.U" (Inst.)		Hyuk Shin, DK, Ross Lara, Todd Wright	03:30
Total length:				29:00

== Awards and nominations ==
Year	Award	Nominated work	Result
Seoul Music Awards
2014	Bonsang Award	Hyde	Won
Golden Disk Awards
2014	Disk Bonsang Award	Jekyll	Nominated

== Chart performance ==
=== Album ===
Chart	Peak position		Sales
Chart	Hyde	Jekyll	Sales
South Korea (Gaon album chart)	3	3	KOR: 181,499
Taiwan (Five-Music) Weekly album chart	8	5	KOR: 181,499
Billboard (US World)	7	—	KOR: 181,499

=== Singles ===
Chart	Peak position	
Chart	"Hyde"	"G.R.8.U"
South Korea (Gaon Singles Chart)	35	14
Billboard (Korea K-Pop Hot 100)	57	13
Billboard (US World)	6	10

== Release history ==
Region	Date	Format	Label
South Korea	May 20, 2013 (Hyde); July 31, 2013 (Jekyll)	CD; Digital download	Jellyfish Entertainment; CJ E&M
Worldwide	May 20, 2013 (Hyde); July 31, 2013 (Jekyll)	Digital download	Jellyfish Entertainment

== See also ==
- List of K-pop albums on the Billboard charts
