= Hades (single album) =

Single album by VIXX
- Released: August 12, 2016
- Genres: K-pop; dance-pop; ballad
- Labels: Jellyfish Entertainment; CJ E&M

VIXX chronology
Hana-Kaze (2016)	Hades (2016)	Kratos (2016)

Music video
- "Fantasy" on YouTube

Hades (/ˈheɪdiːz/; Ancient Greek: ᾍδης or Ἀΐδης, Háidēs) is the sixth single album, and the second part of the VIXX 2016 CONCEPTION trilogy, followed by Kratos and preceded by Zelos, by the South Korean boy band VIXX. The album was released on August 12, 2016 under the label of Jellyfish Entertainment. The song "Fantasy" was used to promote the album.

== Background and release ==
For every song, a different themed God appears. We're preparing a song and performance that suits them.

— VIXX, in Singles Magazine. May 2016 Issue.

On March 29, 2016, Jellyfish Entertainment released the Conception Art Film, which signaled the start of their year-long project and trilogy VIXX 2016 CONCEPTION, through which the group would show their wide musical and conceptual spectrum and would be themed around the gods that appear in Greek mythology. An official Instagram for the project was also created at that time. On April 10, 2016, VIXX released the opening trailer of 2016 CONCEPTION, and nine days later on April 19 released the first album in the trilogy, Zelos which is based upon the god of the same name.

On August 1, 2016, VIXX revealed that the second album would be Hades, which is based on the God Hades; who was the ancient Greek chthonic god of the underworld. On August 2, VIXX began releasing teasers for the album, On August 5, 2016, VIXX revealed the track list of the album, it was also announced that the album would come in two versions, a regular version and a Kihno version. The regular version would come with the CD, 68 page photobook, photo card and poster whilst the Kihno version would come with the Kihno card, post card with printed autograph, a set of 31 photocards and a poster. On August 5, 2016, the group revealed the Hades Concept Film on Naver TV Cast, and on the following day released a video music spoiler to the title song "Fantasy" which features VIXX member Leo playing Beethoven's "Moonlight Sonata". On August 9, VIXX revealed a highlight medley of the songs featured in the album, and on the following day released a teaser of the music video. The music video for "Fantasy" was released on August 14, 2016. "Fantasy" has a darker theme that emphasizes the concept of Hades, Greek god of the Underworld, unlike the first 2016 CONCEPTION release that was conceptualized around Zelos, representative of zeal and jealousy.

Hades charted at number 1 on the Gaon album chart, with the title song "Fantasy" charting at number 22 on the Gaon Digital Chart and number 5 on Billboard World Digital Songs. Hades sold cumulative 97,222 copies in August.

== Composition ==
The title song "Fantasy" was written by songwriter Kim Mi-jin from Music Cube and VIXX member Ravi. The song was composed and arranged by Devine Channel. The track has a "dramatic, orchestral sound" with an "elegant [and] ethereal quality". The second track "Love Me Do" was written by Kim Changrock, Andrew Baag, Han Kyoung-soo and Ravi and composed by Kim Changrock and Andrew Baag with arrangement by Kim Changrock, Andrew Baag and DEVILCAT. The third and final track "Butterfly Effect" (Korean: 나비 효과) was written by Hwang Ji-won from Jam Factory and Ravi and composed by Erik Lidbom and Andreas Oberg. Erik Lidbom for Hitfire Production arranged and produced the track.

== Promotion ==
VIXX began promoting Hades and performing songs from the album at their third concert VIXX Live Fantasia – ELYSIUM from August 13 at the Seoul Olympics Gymnasium, followed by a live Comeback Special on Naver V LIVE on August 14 to commemorate the release of the album. VIXX also performed "Fantasy" and "Love Me Do" on SBS MTV's The Show, followed by music programs MBC Music's Show Champion, KBS's Music Bank, MBC's Show! Music Core, SBS's Inkigayo, and Mnet's M! Countdown. VIXX gained their first win for "Fantasy" on August 23 on The Show. VIXX wrapped up their month long promotions for "Fantasy" on September 11, 2016 on SBS's Inkigayo and during that time VIXX won 1st place three times on the music shows.

== Track listing ==
The credits are adapted from the official homepage of the group.

No.	Title	Lyrics	Music	Length
1.	"Fantasy"	Kim Mi-jin (Music Cube), Ravi	Devine Channel	3:29
2.	"Love Me Do"	Kim Changrock, Andrew Baag, Han Kyoung-soo, Ravi	Kim Changrock, Andrew Baag	3:51
3.	"Butterfly Effect" (나비 효과; Nabihyogwa)	Hwang Ji-won (Jam Factory), Ravi	Erik Lidbom, Andreas Oberg	3:21
4.	"Fantasy" (Inst.)		Devine Channel	3:29
Total length:				15:00

== Awards and nominations ==
=== Awards ===
Year	Award	Category	Recipient	Result
2016	Mnet Asian Music Awards	Best Dance Performance - Male Group	"Fantasy"	Nominated
2016	Mnet Asian Music Awards	Song of the Year	"Fantasy"	Nominated
2016	SBS PopAsia Awards	Album of The Year	Conception Trilogy (Zelos, Hades and Kratos)	Nominated
2016	Gaon Chart Music Awards	3rd Quarter Best Selling Record Award	Hades	Nominated

=== Music program awards ===
Song	Music show	Date
"Fantasy"	The Show	August 23, 2016
"Fantasy"	Show Champion	August 24, 2016
"Fantasy"	The Show	September 6, 2016

== Chart performance ==
Chart	Peak position	Sales
South Korea (Gaon album chart)	1	KOR: 102,554
South Korea (Gaon Digital Chart (Fantasy)	22	KOR: 102,554
Taiwan (FIVE-MUSIC Korea-Japan Album Chart)	2	KOR: 102,554
Billboard World Digital Songs (Fantasy)	5	KOR: 102,554

== Release history ==
Region	Date	Format	Label
South Korea	August 12, 2016	CD; Digital download	Jellyfish Entertainment; CJ E&M
Worldwide	August 12, 2016	Digital download	Jellyfish Entertainment

== See also ==
- VIXX 2016 Conception Ker
- List of Gaon Album Chart number ones of 2016
