= Kratos (EP) =

EP by VIXX
- Released: October 31, 2016
- Genre: K-pop
- Length: 22:00
- Language: Korean
- Label: Jellyfish Entertainment; CJ E&M Music

VIXX chronology
Hades (2016)	Kratos (2016)	VIXX 2016 Conception Ker (2016)

Singles from Kratos
- 1. "The Closer" Released: October 31, 2016

Kratos (Ancient Greek: Κράτος) is the third mini-album, and the third part of the VIXX 2016 CONCEPTION trilogy, preceded by Zelos and Hades, by the South Korean boy band VIXX. The album was released on October 31, 2016, under the label of Jellyfish Entertainment. The song "The Closer" was used to promote the album.

== Background and release ==
For every song, a different themed God appears. We're preparing a song and performance that suits them.

— VIXX, in Singles Magazine. May 2016 Issue.

On March 29, 2016, Jellyfish Entertainment released the Conception Art Film, which signaled the start of their year-long project and trilogy VIXX 2016 CONCEPTION, through which the group would show their wide musical and conceptual spectrum and would be themed around the gods that appear in Greek mythology. An official Instagram for the project was also created at that time. On April 10, 2016, VIXX released the opening trailer of 2016 CONCEPTION, and nine days later on April 19 released the first album in the trilogy, Zelos which is based upon the god of the same name. On August 12, 2016, VIXX released the second album Hades, which is based on the God Hades; who was the God of the underworld.

On October 9, 2016, VIXX revealed that the third album of the trilogy would be Kratos, which is based on the God Kratos; the personification of strength, might, sovereign rule, and authority in all its forms. On October 16, at 10:31 p.m. KST, VIXX began releasing teasers for the album, beginning with a video titled "VIXX 2016 CONCEPTION Κήρ TRilOGY VIDEO". On October 20, 2016, the group revealed the Kratos Concept Film on Naver TV Cast and also revealed the album's title track, and on the following day revealed the album's track list. On October 24, VIXX revealed a highlight medley of the songs featured in the album. It was also announced that the album would come in two versions, a regular version and a Kihno version. The regular version would come with the CD, 68 page photobook, photo card, poster and a hologram film whilst the Kihno version would come with the Kihno card, post card with printed autograph, a set of 30 photocards and a poster. From October 24 to October 27, VIXX revealed individual character trailer with each member having his own concept. On October 28, VIXX released a teaser of the music video. On October 31, VIXX released Kratos along with the music video for the title song "The Closer".

Kratos entered and charted at number 2 on the Gaon album chart, at number 5 on Taiwan's FIVE-MUSIC Korea-Japan Album Chart and Billboard's world albums chart, with the title song "The Closer" charting at number 8 on the Gaon Digital Chart and number 14 on Billboard World Digital Songs. Kratos sold cumulative 57,456 copies in October.

== Composition ==
The EP consists of five tracks and one instrumental. The title song "The Closer" was written by songwriter Kim Mi-jin from Music Cube and VIXX member Ravi. The song was composed and arranged by Devine Channel. The second track "Desperate" was written by MAFLY, Park Woo-hyun and Ravi with music composed by Erik Lidbom and MELODESIGN with arrangement by Erik Lidbom for Hitfire Production. The third track "Shooting Star" was written by MAFLY, KEYFLY and Ravi with music composed by Simon Janlöv, MLC and Cho Yong-ho, it was also arranged by Cho Yong-ho. The fourth track "Good Night & Good Morning" was written and composed by Ravi and arranged by Kiggen. The fifth track "Romance is Over" (Korean: 로맨스는 끝났다) was written by VIXX members Ravi and Leo with composition also by Leo and arrangement by Cho Yong-ho.

== Promotion ==
VIXX began promoting Kratos with a live showcase on Naver V LIVE on October 31, 2016, at YES24 Live Hall, followed by performances on the following music programs; SBS MTV's The Show, MBC Music's Show Champion, KBS's Music Bank, MBC's Show! Music Core, SBS's Inkigayo, and Mnet's M! Countdown. VIXX gained their first win for "The Closer" on November 8 on The Show. On the 20th of November VIXX wrapped up their three week long promotions for "The Closer" on SBS's Inkigayo.

== Track listing ==
The credits are adapted from the official homepage of the group.

No.	Title	Lyrics	Music	Length
1.	"The Closer"	Kim Mi-jin (Music Cube), Ravi	Devine Channel	3:45
2.	"Desperate"	MAFLY, Park Woo-hyun, Ravi	Erik Lidbom, MELODESIGN	3:31
3.	"Shooting Star"	MAFLY, KEYFLY, Ravi	Simon Janlöv, MLC, Cho Yong-ho	3:28
4.	"Good Night & Good Morning"	Ravi	Ravi	3:17
5.	"Romance is Over" (로맨스는 끝났다; Lomaenseuneun Kkeutnassda)	Leo, Ravi	Leo	3:41
6.	"The Closer" (Inst.)		Devine Channel	3:45
Total length:				22:00

== Awards and nominations ==
=== Awards ===
Year	Award	Category	Recipient	Result
2016	SBS PopAsia Awards	Album of The Year	Conception Trilogy (Zelos, Hades and Kratos)	Nominated

=== Music program awards ===
Song	Music show	Date
"The Closer"	The Show	November 8, 2016
"The Closer"	Show Champion	November 9, 2016

== Chart performance ==
Chart	Peak position	Sales
South Korea (Gaon album chart)	2	KOR: 97,176; JPN: 1,785
Japan (Oricon Weekly album chart)	48	KOR: 97,176; JPN: 1,785
Taiwan (Five-Music) Weekly album chart	5	KOR: 97,176; JPN: 1,785
Billboard (US World)	5	KOR: 97,176; JPN: 1,785

== Release history ==
Region	Date	Format	Label
South Korea	October 31, 2016	CD; Digital download	Jellyfish Entertainment; CJ E&M
Worldwide	October 31, 2016	Digital download	Jellyfish Entertainment

== See also ==
- VIXX 2016 Conception Ker
- List of K-pop albums on the Billboard charts
