= Zelos (single album) =

Single album by VIXX
- Released: April 19, 2016
- Genre: K-pop; dance-pop; ballad
- Length: 14:00
- Label: Jellyfish Entertainment; CJ E&M

VIXX chronology
| Depend on Me (2016) | Zelos (2016) | Hana-Kaze (2016) |

Music video
- "Dynamite" on YouTube

Zelos (/ˈziːləs/; Greek: Ζῆλος, Zēlos, literally "zeal") is the fifth single album, and the first part of the VIXX 2016 CONCEPTION trilogy, followed by Hades and Kratos, by the South Korean boy band VIXX. The album was released on April 19, 2016 under the label of Jellyfish Entertainment. The song "Dynamite" (Korean: 다이너마이트) was used to promote the album.

== Background and release ==
On March 16, 2016 Jellyfish Entertainment revealed that VIXX would return with a new album on April 19, 2016, which was said to be more mature and powerful. With fan anticipation growing, a representative said "Whatever you’re expecting, expect more. In addition to their music, VIXX is a group that gets interest for their performance, fashion, accessories, etc. As always, we’re preparing to capture the public’s attention with this album." On March 29, 2016, Jellyfish Entertainment released the Conception Art Film, which was said to signal the start of their year-long project and trilogy VIXX 2016 CONCEPTION, through which the group would show their wide musical and conceptual spectrum. An official Instagram for the project was also created at that time.

On April 10, 2016, VIXX released the opening trailer of 2016 CONCEPTION, and on April 12, 2015, they revealed teasers to their upcoming fifth single album, Zelos. It was also announced that the album would come in two versions, a regular version and a Kihno version. The regular version would come with the CD, 68-page photobook, photo card and poster while the Kihno version would come with the Kihno card, post card with printed autograph, a set of 30 photocards and a poster. On April 14, 2016, the group revealed the Zelos Concept Film, along with the release of the track list and highlight medley. On April 17, VIXX released the Official Teaser for "Dynamite". On April 18, an hour before the release VIXX went live on Naver V Live counting down to the moment Zelos was released. During the countdown VIXX shared fun and interesting stories about the album, as well as singing the title track "Dynamite" (Korean: 다이너마이트) and ballad "Bad Bye" (Korean: 손의이별) live. After the release of Zelos, on April 19, 2016, the title track "Dynamite" topped the digital charts at number one on Naver Music, Mnet, Bugs, and Genie while they were high on the charts for Melon, Olleh, and Soribada. The music video for "Dynamite" was released on April 20, 2016. The music video features Jellyfish Trainee and Produce 101 contestant Kim Na-young as the veiled woman.

Zelos charted at number 1 on the Gaon album chart selling cumulative 89,910 copies in April, with the title song "Dynamite" charting at number 14 on the Gaon Digital Chart and number 4 on Billboard World Digital Songs.

=== Concept ===
VIXX 2016 CONCEPTION, VIXX's year-long project is themed around the gods that appear in Greek mythology and their 5th single album concept is based upon Zelos; the Greek God of Jealousy and Rivalry.

Member N states:

For every song, a different themed God appears. We're preparing a song and performance that suits them..

Member Ravi states:

Our lead track, "Dynamite," is about a guy being blinded by jealousy and willing to turn the world upside down to get his ex back..

== Composition ==
"Dynamite" (Korean: 다이너마이트) was written by songwriter Misfit and VIXX member Ravi. The song was composed by Simon Janlöv, Andrew Choi and MELODESIGN and arranged and produced by Simon Janlöv for Hitfire Production. The second track "Six Feet Under" (Korean: 늪) was written by Kim Sujeong and Ravi and composed and arranged by Harry Brooks, Dan Goudie and Ash Milton. The third and final track "Bad Bye" (Korean: 손의이별) was written by Kim Ji-hyang and Ravi and composed and arranged by MELODESIGN, Keeproots and Fascinating.

== Promotion ==
VIXX began promoting Zelos with a showcase at Lotte Card Art Center in Seoul on April 19, 2016 followed by performing "Dynamite" (Korean: 다이너마이트) and ballad "Bad Bye" (Korean: 손의이별) on SBS MTV's The Show. They performed on various music programs including KBS's Music Bank, MBC's Show! Music Core, SBS's Inkigayo, Mnet's M! Countdown and MBC Music's Show Champion. VIXX gained their first win for "Dynamite" on April 26 on The Show. VIXX wrapped up their month long promotions for "Dynamite" (Korean: 다이너마이트) on May 15, 2016 on Inkigayo and during that time VIXX won 1st place five times on the music shows and achieved their second Triple Crown on The Show.

== Track listing ==
The credits are adapted from the official homepage of the group.

| No. | Title | Lyrics | Music | Length |
|---|---|---|---|---|
| 1. | "Dynamite" (다이너마이트; Daineomaiteu) | Misfit, Ravi | Simon Janlöv, Andrew Choi, MELODESIGN | 3:36 |
| 2. | "Six Feet Under" (늪; Neup) | Kim Sujeong, Ravi | Harry Brooks, Dan Goudie, Ash Milton | 3:01 |
| 3. | "Bad Bye" (손의 이별; Sonuiibyeol) (Translation: "Parting of Hands" or "Farewell Hands") | Kim Ji-hyang, Ravi | MELODESIGN, Keeproots, Fascinating | 3:56 |
| 4. | "Dynamite" (Inst.) | | Simon Janlöv, Andrew Choi, MELODESIGN | 3:36 |
| Total length: | | | | 14:00 |

== Chart performance ==
| Chart | Peak position | Sales |
|---|---|---|
| South Korea (Gaon album chart) | 1 | KOR: 108,870 |
| South Korea (Gaon Digital Chart (Dynamite) | 14 | KOR: 108,870 |
| Billboard World Digital Songs (Dynamite) | 4 | KOR: 108,870 |

== Awards and nominations ==
=== Awards ===
| Year | Award | Category | Recipient | Result |
|---|---|---|---|---|
| 2016 | SBS PopAsia Awards | Album of The Year | Conception Trilogy (Zelos, Hades and Kratos) | Nominated |
| 2017 | Seoul Music Awards | Bonsang Award | "Dynamite" | Won |

=== Music program awards ===
| Song | Music show | Date |
|---|---|---|
| "Dynamite" | The Show | April 26, 2016 |
| "Dynamite" | Show Champion | April 27, 2016 |
| "Dynamite" | Music Bank | April 29, 2016 |
| "Dynamite" | The Show | May 3, 2016 |
| "Dynamite" | The Show | May 10, 2016 |

== Credits and personnel ==
- VIXX – vocals
  - Cha Hakyeon (N) – Lead vocals, background vocals
  - Jung Taekwoon (Leo) – Main vocals, background vocals
  - Lee Jaehwan (Ken)- Main vocals, background vocals
  - Kim Wonsik (Ravi) – rap, songwriting
  - Lee Hongbin – vocals, rap
  - Han Sanghyuk (Hyuk) – vocals, rap
- Misfit – songwriting
- Kim Sujeong – songwriting
- Kim Ji-hyang – songwriting
- Simon Janlöv for Hitfire Production – producer, music

== Release history ==
| Region | Date | Format | Label |
|---|---|---|---|
| South Korea | April 19, 2016 | CD; Digital download | Jellyfish Entertainment; CJ E&M |
| Worldwide | April 19, 2016 | Digital download | Jellyfish Entertainment |

== See also ==
- VIXX 2016 Conception Ker
- List of Gaon Album Chart number ones of 2016
