= VIXX 2016 Conception Ker =

Compilation album by VIXX
- Released: November 21, 2016
- Genre: K-pop, dance-pop
- Language: Korean
- Label: Jellyfish Entertainment; CJ E&M Music

VIXX chronology
Kratos (2016)	VIXX 2016 Conception Ker (2016)	Shangri-La (2017)

Singles from VIXX 2016 Conception Ker
- 1. "Milky Way" Released: November 21, 2016

VIXX 2016 Conception Ker (stylized as VIXX 2016 CONCEPTION Κήρ) is the second compilation album by South Korean boy band VIXX. The special album was released on November 21, 2016 under Jellyfish Entertainment, supported by a music video and a new song. The album contains songs from their two single albums Zelos and Hades and mini-album Kratos. The song "Milky Way" was chosen as the album's title track.

== Background and release ==
Before the release of the special album, this year-long project was divided into three parts under the title of VIXX 2016 CONCEPTION with the keyword Ker (Κήρ) and was conceptualized around the Gods that appear in Greek mythology, it included VIXX's two single albums Zelos; released on April 19, 2016 and Hades; released on August 12, 2016 and their third mini-album Kratos which was released on October 31, 2016. VIXX 2016 CONCEPTION also included concept films, art films and trailers such as the Conception Art Film and VIXX 2016 CONCEPTION OPENING TRAILER to furthermore show the concept for each part of the trilogy including the series itself.

Zelos was the first album in the trilogy, it had three tracks including the title track "Dynamite" (Korean: 다이너마이트) and it was based upon the Greek God of Zelos; the Greek God of Jealousy and Rivalry. The second album Hades also had three tracks including the title track “Fantasy" and it was based upon Hades; who was the ancient Greek chthonic god of the underworld. The final album in the trilogy was Kratos and unlike the previous releases Kratos had five tracks including the title track "The Closer" and it was based upon Kratos; the personification of strength, might, sovereign rule, and authority in all its forms. Each album was packaged in the same way and each album had an accompanying concept film which was released before the music videos and albums themselves.

The trilogy was commercially successful with Zelos and Hades charting at Number 1 and Kratos charting at Number 2 on the Gaon album chart. Zelos sold 110,334 cumulative copies in the months of April and May. Hades sold 103,450 cumulative copies in the months of August and September, and Kratos sold 57,456 cumulative copies in October.

On November 11, 2016, VIXX revealed that they would be releasing a special album to wrap up and celebrate the end of the VIXX 2016 CONCEPTION project. On November 14, VIXX revealed that the special album titled VIXX 2016 CONCEPTION KER (Κήρ) will consist of two discs (CD and DVD), a 92-page 2016 Conception commentary book and 92 page photo book, random poster and bookmark shaped like a key in a special box that doubles as a collectors box for the original trilogy albums Zelos, Hades and Kratos.

On November 15, it was announced that the title song of the special album would be called “Milky Way” which was written by VIXX members Ravi and Hyuk and composed and arranged by Justin Reinstein. The accompanying music video for “Milky Way” was filmed on the 13th of November, it features scenes of 600 fans from VIXX's Official Fanclub ST★RLIGHT at KINTEX in Ilsan, Gyeonggi Province.

== Track listing ==
VIXX 2016 Conception Ker (CD)
No.	Title	Lyrics	Music	Length
1.	"Milky Way"	Ravi, Hyuk	Justin Reinstein	3:27
2.	"Dynamite" (다이너마이트; Daineomaiteu)	Misfit, Ravi	Simon Janlöv, Andrew Choi, MELODESIGN	3:36
3.	"Six Feet Under" (늪; Neup)	Kim Sujeong, Ravi	Harry Brooks, Dan Goudie, Ash Milton	3:01
4.	"Bad Bye" (손의 이별; Sonuiibyeol) (Translation: "Parting of Hands" or "Farewell Hands")	Kim Ji-hyang, Ravi	MELODESIGN, Keeproots, Fascinating	3:56
5.	"Fantasy"	Kim Mi-jin (Music Cube), Ravi	Devine Channel	3:29
6.	"Love Me Do"	Kim Changrock, Andrew Baag, Han Kyoung-soo, Ravi	Kim Changrock, Andrew Baag	3:51
7.	"Butterfly Effect" (나비 효과; Nabihyogwa)	Hwang Ji-won (Jam Factory), Ravi	Erik Lidbom, Andreas Oberg	3:21
8.	"The Closer"	Kim Mi-jin (Music Cube), Ravi	Devine Channel	3:45
9.	"Desperate"	MAFLY, Park Woo-hyun, Ravi	Erik Lidbom, MELODESIGN	3:31
10.	"Shooting Star"	MAFLY, KEYFLY, Ravi	Simon Janlöv, MLC, Cho Yong-ho	3:28
11.	"Good Night & Good Morning"	Ravi	Ravi	3:17
12.	"Romance Is Over" (로맨스는 끝났다; Lomaenseuneun Kkeutnassda)	Leo, Ravi	Leo	3:41
Total length:				43:00

VIXX 2016 Conception Ker (DVD)
No.	Title	Length
1.	"VIXX 2016 CONCEPTION Art Film"	0:57
2.	"VIXX 2016 CONCEPTION Opening Trailer"	0:50
3.	"VIXX 2016 CONCEPTION OPENING BEHIND"	2:45
4.	"Zelos Concept Film"	1:06
5.	"다이너마이트 MV Teaser" (Dynamite MV Teaser)	0:28
6.	"다이너마이트 MV 본편" (Dynamite MV main story)	3:31
7.	"다이너마이트 MV Making Video #1" (Dynamite MV Making Video #1)	3:31
8.	"다이너마이트 MV Making Video #2" (Dynamite MV Making Video #2)	2:57
9.	"Hades Concept Film"	1:05
10.	"Fantasy MV Teaser"	0:31
11.	"Fantasy MV"	3:29
12.	"Fantasy MV Performance ver."	3:29
13.	"Fantasy MV Drama ver."	3:31
14.	"Fantasy MV Making Video"	5:57
15.	"Kratos Concept Film"	1:10
16.	"VIXX 2016 CONCEPTION Character Trailer KEN"	0:28
17.	"VIXX 2016 CONCEPTION Character Trailer HONGBIN"	0:27
18.	"VIXX 2016 CONCEPTION Character Trailer RAVI"	0:25
19.	"VIXX 2016 CONCEPTION Character Trailer LEO"	0:23
20.	"VIXX 2016 CONCEPTION Character Trailer HYUK"	0:25
21.	"VIXX 2016 CONCEPTION Character Trailer N"	0:26
22.	"The Closer MV Teaser"	0:38
23.	"The Closer MV"	3:50
24.	"The Closer MV Making Video"	4:15
Total length:		22:34

== Chart performance ==
Chart	Peak position	Sales
South Korea (Gaon album chart)	2	KOR: 18,082; JPN: 951
Japan (Oricon Weekly album chart)	77	KOR: 18,082; JPN: 951
Taiwan (Five-Music) Weekly album chart	9	KOR: 18,082; JPN: 951

== Release history ==
Region	Date	Format	Label
South Korea	November 21, 2016	CD+DVD; Digital download	Jellyfish Entertainment; CJ E&M
Worldwide	November 21, 2016	Digital download	Jellyfish Entertainment
Japan	November 23, 2016	CD+DVD	Jellyfish Entertainment; CJ Victor Entertainment
