= Beautiful Liar (EP) =

EP by VIXX LR
- Released: August 17, 2015
- Recorded: Seoul, South Korea
- Genre: K-pop, Hip Hop, dance pop
- Length: 22:00
- Language: Korean
- Label: Jellyfish Entertainment

VIXX LR chronology
Beautiful Liar (2015)	Whisper (2017)

Alternative Cover
- Character Version

Singles from Beautiful Liar
- 1. "Beautiful Liar" Released: August 17, 2015

Beautiful Liar is the debut mini-album by South Korean boy band VIXX's first official sub-unit VIXX LR. The EP was released on August 17, 2015, under the label of Jellyfish Entertainment.

== Background ==
On August 7, 2015, Jellyfish Entertainment released a video trailer on VIXX's official website after a mysterious countdown with a silhouette of VIXX's last special album Boys' Record. As time went by, members of VIXX disappeared until finally only Leo and Ravi were left behind, which caused fans to speculate that it meant another comeback for all six members. A video trailer of VIXX LR was then revealed. After a series of image and video teasers, VIXX LR was confirmed by Jellyfish Entertainment to be VIXX's first official sub-unit composed of rapper Ravi and vocalist Leo. Following the release of the music video on VIXX's official YouTube channel, the EP was officially released on August 17, 2015.

== Composition ==
The EP consists of five tracks and one instrumental all of which are written and composed by either Ravi or Leo as the composer duo of VIXX. The title track on the album, "Beautiful Liar", was written by Ravi, Kim Ji-hyang and Rhymer and composed by Ravi and MELODESIGN with arrangement by ASSBRASS and Cho Yong-ho, both Leo and Ravi provided the vocals to this track as with the second track "Remember" which was written entirely by Ravi and arranged by Kiggen. The third track "Words to Say" (Korean: 할 말); Leo's Solo was written entirely by himself and arranged by MELODESIGN. The fourth track "Ghost"; Ravi's Solo was written entirely by himself and arranged by himself and Cho Yong-ho. The fifth track "My Light" was written by Leo and Ravi and composed by Leo and MELODESIGN with arrangement also by MELODESIGN, all of VIXX provided the vocals to this track.

== Music video ==
In the rather symbolic and emotional music video for "Beautiful Liar", the story is about a man; Leo and a woman breaking up, on the way out Leo gets a wedding invitation from his ex-girlfriend. Leo is shown with two different personalities; the truth and the lie. The lie being Leo who wants to let his ex-girlfriend go and forget her and the truth being the physical manifestation of Ravi who is trying to keep a hold of her, wanting and needing her to stay. Throughout the music video the truth (Ravi) and the lie (Leo) are at odds with each other with their conflicting emotions, until finally Leo overcomes Ravi and is left alone admitting that he is a cowardly liar.

== Promotion ==
VIXX LR began their promotions with their first showcase for Beautiful Liar at Yes24 Muv Hall in Seoul′s Mapo-gu on August 17, 2015. The duo then started promoting and performing from August 18 on various music programs including SBS MTV's The Show, KBS's Music Bank, MBC's Show! Music Core, SBS's Inkigayo, Mnet's, M! Countdown and MBC Music's Show Champion. On September 1 VIXX LR gained their first ever music show win since their debut on SBS MTV's The Show with 9,464 of the votes making them have the second-highest all time score, behind their parent group VIXX with "Error". On September 4, 2015, VIXX LR wrapped up their three-week promotional cycle for Beautiful Liar on KBS2's Music Bank with a goodbye stage performance. In January 2016 it was announced that VIXX LR will be holding their first Japan showcase tour for Beautiful Liar.

=== Showcase Tour ===
Date	Venue	Location	Country
August 17, 2015	Yes24 Muv Hall	Mapo-gu, Seoul	South Korea
January 6, 2016	Nagoya Diamond Hall	Nagoya	Japan
January 10, 2016	Toyosu PIT	Tokyo	Japan
January 15, 2016	Osaka Business Park circular hall	Osaka	Japan

== Track listing ==
The credits are adapted from the official homepage of the group.

No.	Title	Lyrics	Music	Arrangement	Length
1.	"Beautiful Liar"	Ravi, Kim Ji-hyang, Rhymer	Ravi, MELODESIGN	ASSBRASS, Cho Yong-ho	3:54
2.	"Remember"	Ravi	Ravi	Kiggen	3:25
3.	"Words to Say" (할 말; Hal mal) (Leo Solo)	Leo	Leo	MELODESIGN	3:39
4.	"Ghost" (Ravi Solo)	Ravi	Ravi	Cho Yong-ho, Ravi	3:17
5.	"My Light" (Song by VIXX)	Leo, Ravi	Leo, MELODESIGN	MELODESIGN	3:11
6.	"Beautiful Liar" (Inst.)				3:54
Total length:					22:00

== Chart performance ==
Chart	Peak position	Sales
South Korea (Gaon Weekly albums chart)	2	KOR: 138,267
South Korea (Gaon Weekly singles chart)	21	KOR: 138,267
US World (Weekly world albums chart)	2	KOR: 138,267

== Awards and nominations ==
=== Awards ===
Year	Award	Category	Recipient	Result
2015	Mnet Asian Music Awards	Best Collaboration and Unit	"Beautiful Liar"	Nominated
2015	Mnet Asian Music Awards	Song of the Year	"Beautiful Liar"	Nominated
2015	KMC Radio Awards	Best Sub-unit/Collaboration	"Beautiful Liar"	Won
2015	KMC Radio Awards	Song of the Year	"Beautiful Liar"	Nominated

=== Music program awards ===
Song	Music show	Date
"Beautiful Liar"	The Show	September 1, 2015

== Release history ==
Region	Date	Format	Label
South Korea	August 17, 2015	CD; Digital download	Jellyfish Entertainment; CJ E&M Music
Worldwide	August 17, 2015	Digital download	Jellyfish Entertainment

== See also ==
- List of K-pop albums on the Billboard charts
