= Whisper (EP) =

EP by VIXX LR
- Released: August 28, 2017
- Recorded: Seoul, South Korea
- Genre: K-pop, Hip Hop, dance pop
- Language: Korean
- Label: Jellyfish Entertainment; CJ E&M Music

VIXX LR chronology
Beautiful Liar (2015)	Whisper (2017)

Singles from Whisper
- 1. "Whisper" Released: August 28, 2017

Whisper is the second mini-album by South Korean pop duo VIXX LR, sub-unit of the boy band VIXX . The EP was released on August 28, 2017 under the label of Jellyfish Entertainment.

== Background and composition ==
On July 19, 2017, Jellyfish Entertainment announced that VIXX LR is aiming to make a comeback and release a new album in August. On August 14, VIXX LR announced that their second mini album Whisper would be released on August 28, 2017. The album contains five tracks all of which are written and composed by either Ravi or Leo. On August 22, VIXX shared a highlight medley with snippets of all the songs from the album, followed by a teaser of the official music video on August 25, 2017.

== Promotion ==
VIXX LR will begin promoting Whisper with a comeback showcase on VLIVE on August 28. Followed by performances on The Show on SBS MTV, Show Champion on MBC Music, M! Countdown on Mnet, Music Bank on KBS, Show! Music Core on MBC and Inkigayo on SBS.

== Track listing ==
The credits are adapted from the official homepage of the group.

No.	Title	Lyrics	Music	Length
1.	"Whisper"	Ravi	Ravi, Yuth	3:35
2.	"Beautiful Night" (아름다운 밤에; Aleumdaun bam-e)	Leo, Ravi	Leo, AVGS	3:39
3.	"Feeling"	Leo, Ravi	Leo, AVGS	3:06
4.	"Chocolatier"	Ravi	Ravi, PUFF, Song Si-yoon	3:21
5.	"Today"	Ravi	Ravi, PUFF	3:22
6.	"Whisper" (Instrumental)		Ravi, Yuth	3:35

== Chart performance ==
Chart (2017)	Peak position
Japanese Albums (Oricon)	91
South Korean Albums (Gaon)	1
US World Albums (Billboard)	2

== Release history ==
Region	Date	Format	Label
South Korea	August 28, 2017	CD; Digital download	Jellyfish Entertainment; CJ E&M Music
Worldwide	August 28, 2017	Digital download	Jellyfish Entertainment

== See also ==
- List of K-pop albums on the Billboard charts
- List of Gaon Album Chart number ones of 2017
