= R.eal1ze =

EP by Ravi
- Released: January 9, 2017
- Genre: Hip hop
- Length: 24:24
- Language: Korean
- Labels: Jellyfish Entertainment; CJ E&M Music

Ravi chronology
[R.ebirth] (2016)	R.eal1ze (2017)	Nirvana (2018)

Singles from R.eal1ze
- 1. "Home Alone (나홀로 집에)" Released: January 4, 2017; 2. "Bomb" Released: January 9, 2017

R.eal1ze (stylized as R.EAL1ZE) is the first mini-album by South Korean rapper Ravi. The full mini-album was released on January 9, 2017, under the label of Jellyfish Entertainment.

== Promotion and release ==
Prior to the mini-album's release, the single "Home Alone" was pre-released on January 4, 2017. Ravi also held three pre-release concerts in Seoul titled Ravi 1st Real-Live [R.eal1ze] on January 6, 7, and 8, where he performed songs from R.eal1ze and his mixtape [R.ebirth].

R.eal1ze was released in its entirety on January 9, 2017. A music video for its lead single "Bomb", directed by production company Vikings League, was released on the same day as the full mini-album. However, within hours of the music video's release, it attracted controversy; viewers made accusations of misogyny and objectification of women due to the presence of women in lingerie throughout the video. Ravi and Jellyfish Entertainment apologized and deleted the video. An edited version of the music video (without the controversial scenes) was uploaded shortly after. Ravi promoted the album by performing "Bomb" on multiple music programs, including M Countdown, Music Bank, Show! Music Core, Inkigayo, Show Champion, and Simply K-Pop.

== Track listing ==
The credits are adapted from the official Twitter account of VIXX, Ravi's group at the time.

R.eal1ze - EP
No.	Title	Lyrics	Music	Length
1.	"Bomb" (featuring San E)	Ravi, San E	Ravi, PUFF	3:26
2.	"Rose" (featuring Ken of VIXX)	Ravi	Ravi, ASSBRASS	3:41
3.	"Ladi Dadi" (featuring Microdot, Jero)	Ravi, Microdot	Ravi, PUFF	3:38
4.	"나홀로 집에 (Home Alone)" (featuring Jung Yong-hwa)	Ravi	Ravi, MELODESIGN	3:11
5.	"아 몰라 일단 Do The Dance"	Ravi	Ravi, SAM&SP3CK	3:17
6.	"Lean on Me"	Ravi	Ravi, PUFF	3:20
7.	"뇌비우스의 띠 (Möbius Strip)" (featuring ESBEE)	Ravi	Ravi, PUFF	3:51
Total length:				24:24

Note: "아 몰라 일단 Do The Dance", "Lean on Me", and "뇌비우스의 띠 (Möbius Strip)" were initially released on Ravi's mixtape [R.ebirth] in 2016, but included on R.eal1ze as well.

== Chart performance ==
Chart	Peak position	Sales
Gaon Weekly Albums Chart (South Korea)	2	KOR: 23,547
Billboard World Albums Chart	8	
