= List of Gaon Album Chart number ones of 2016 =

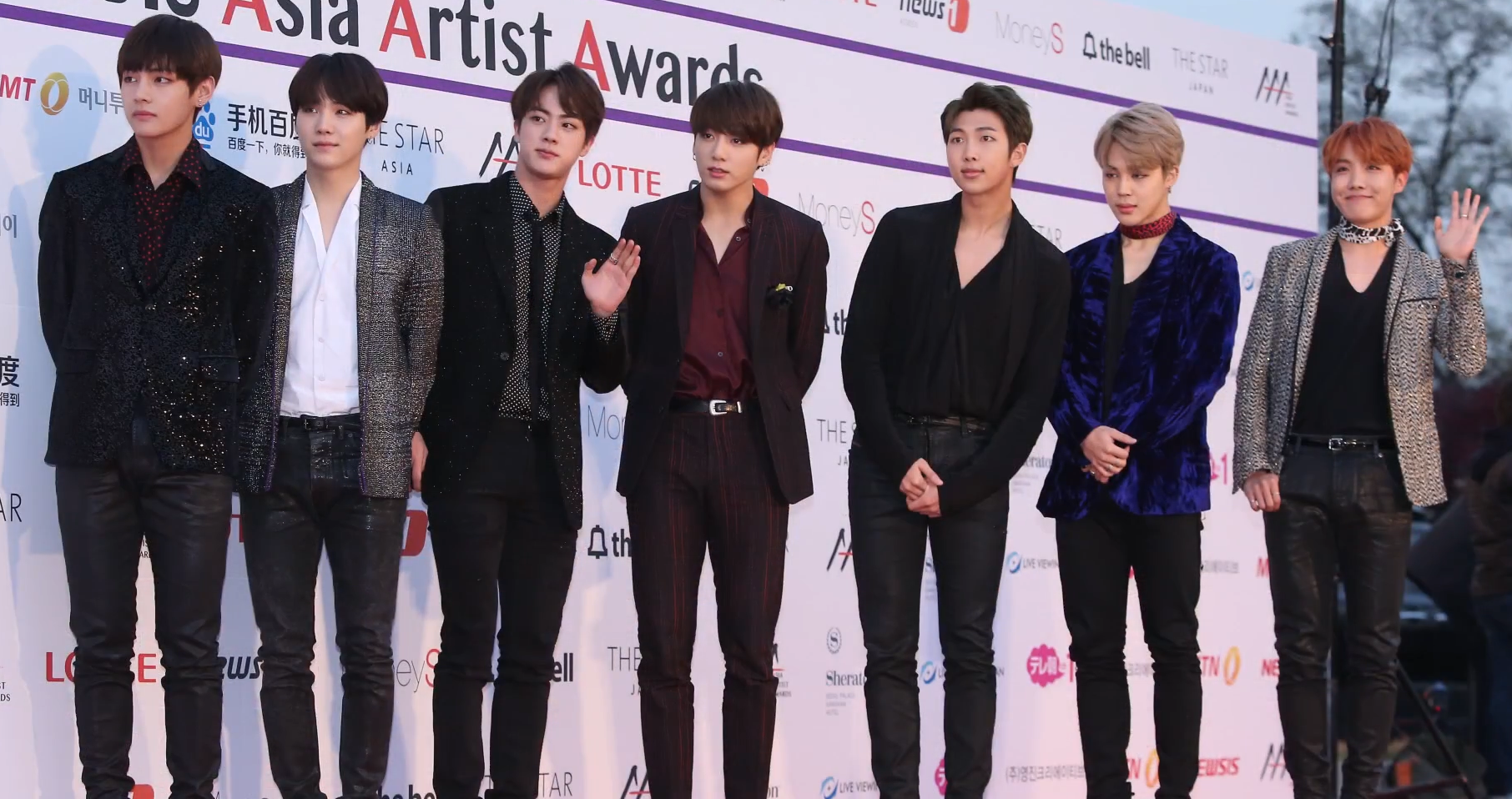
BTS' album Wings was 2016 Gaon Album Chart best selling album of the year, breaking Gaon Music Chart's record since the chart’s inception in 2010.

The Gaon Album Chart is a record chart that ranks the best-selling albums and EPs in South Korea. It is part of the Gaon Music Chart which launched in February 2010. The data for the chart is compiled by the Ministry of Culture, Sports and Tourism and the Korean Music Content Industry Association based on weekly and monthly physical album sales by major distributors such as LOEN Entertainment, Genie Music, Sony Music Korea, Warner Music Korea, Universal Music and Mnet Media.

Overall, BTS' album Wings was Gaon Album Chart best selling album of 2016, selling 751,301 copies. With Wings, BTS had the highest-selling album ever recorded on Gaon Music Chart since the chart's inception in 2010.

== Weekly charts ==
| Week | Album | Artist | Ref. |
|---|---|---|---|
| January 2 | Sing for You (Korean Version) | Exo | |
| January 9 | The Most Beautiful Moment in Life, Pt. 2 | BTS | |
| January 16 | Dream | Suzy, Baekhyun | |
| January 23 | Red Point | Teen Top | |
| January 30 | The Little Prince | Kim Ryeowook | |
| February 6 | Exit : E | Winner | |
| February 13 | No.X | Jaejoong | |
| February 20 | No.X | Jaejoong | |
| February 27 | Press It | Taemin | |
| March 5 | Press It | Taemin | |
| March 12 | The Most Beautiful Moment In Life, Part 1 | BTS | |
| March 19 | The Velvet | Red Velvet | |
| March 26 | Flight Log: Departure | Got7 | |
| April 2 | Remember That | BtoB | |
| April 9 | Blueming | CNBLUE | |
| April 16 | Blooming Period | Block B | |
| April 23 | Zelos | VIXX | |
| April 30 | Love&Letter | Seventeen | |
| May 7 | The Most Beautiful Moment In Life: Young Forever | BTS | |
| May 14 | The Most Beautiful Moment In Life: Young Forever | BTS | |
| May 21 | With Love, J | Jessica | |
| May 28 | She Is | Jonghyun | |
| June 4 | Xignature | Xia | |
| June 11 | With Love, J | Jessica | |
| June 18 | Ex'Act (Korean Version) | Exo | |
| June 25 | Ex'Act (Korean Version) | Exo | |
| July 2 | Why | Taeyeon | |
| July 9 | Highlight | Beast | |
| July 16 | Love & Letter Repackage | Seventeen | |
| July 23 | Where's the Truth? | F.T. Island | |
| July 30 | NCT #127 | NCT 127 | |
| August 6 | Listen to My Word | Oh My Girl | |
| August 13 | Hades | VIXX | |
| August 20 | Lotto (Korean Version) | Exo | |
| August 27 | Hades | VIXX | |
| September 3 | Summer go! | UP10TION | |
| September 10 | Russian Roulette | Red Velvet | |
| September 17 | Gentlemen's Game | 2PM | |
| September 24 | Infinite Only | Infinite | |
| October 1 | Flight Log: Turbulence | Got7 | |
| October 8 | 1 of 1 | Shinee | |
| October 15 | Wings | BTS | |
| October 22 | Wings | BTS | |
| October 29 | Twicecoaster: Lane 1 | Twice | |
| November 5 | Hey Mama! | Exo-CBX | |
| November 12 | Lose Control | Lay | |
| November 19 | 1 and 1 | Shinee | |
| November 26 | Burst | UP10TION | |
| December 3 | Good Timing | B1A4 | |
| December 10 | Going Seventeen | Seventeen | |
| December 17 | Wonderland | Jessica | |
| December 24 | For Life | Exo | |
| December 31 | Twicecoaster: Lane 1 | Twice | |

== Monthly charts ==
| Month | Album | Artist | Sales | Ref. |
|---|---|---|---|---|
| January | Red Point | Teen Top | 78,098 | |
| February | No.X | Jaejoong | 84,868 | |
| March | Flight Log: Departure | Got7 | 99,977 | |
| April | Love&Letter | Seventeen | 132,402 | |
| May | The Most Beautiful Moment In Life: Young Forever | BTS | 310,243 | |
| June | Ex'Act (Korean Version) | Exo | 524,823 | |
| July | Love & Letter Repackage | Seventeen | 89,311 | |
| August | Lotto (korean ver) | Exo | 223,953 | |
| September | Infinite Only | Infinite | 109,751 | |
| October | Wings | BTS | 681,924 | |
| November | Lose Control | Lay | 129,140 | |
| December | For Life | Exo | 438,481 | |
