= VIXX LR =

South Korean boy band

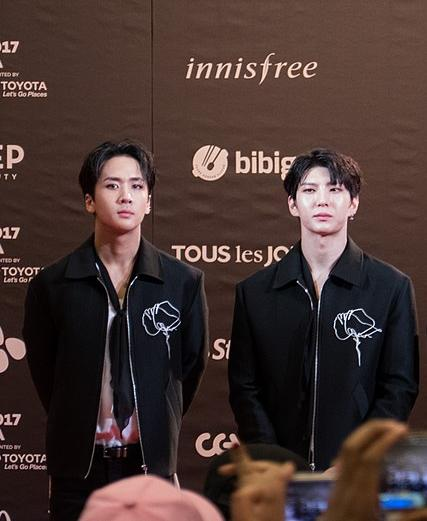
- VIXX LR's Ravi and Leo at KCON LA 2017 Red Carpet

Background information
- Origin: Seoul, South Korea
- Genres: K-pop; hip hop
- Years active: 2015–2017
- Label: Jellyfish
- Spinoff of: VIXX
- Past members: Leo; Ravi

VIXX LR (Korean: 빅스 LR) was the first official sub-unit of South Korean boy band VIXX formed by Jellyfish Entertainment. Established in August 2015, VIXX LR consists of VIXX vocalist Leo and rapper Ravi. The duo debuted with their first mini album, Beautiful Liar, on August 17, 2015.

== Name ==
VIXX LR is a combination of VIXX (Korean: 빅스 pronounced "vicks"; acronym for voice, visual, value in excelsis) and the initials of the members stage names, "L" for Leo and "R" for Ravi. At their debut showcase, Leo further explained that the name also stands for "left" and "right", in reference to their contrasting qualities and images that create harmony when they perform together. Ravi gave an additional, more literal interpretation, saying it correlates to their positions while standing on stage from the audience's point of view. The letters "L" and "R" also represent the first and last letters in the word "liar" from the title of their debut EP, Beautiful Liar, and its lead single of the same name.

== History ==
On August 7, 2015, Jellyfish Entertainment released a video trailer on VIXX's official website after a mysterious countdown with a silhouette of the group's last special album Boys' Record. As time went by, the band members disappeared one by one, until only Leo and Ravi remained, raising speculation that another comeback for the group was imminent. A video trailer for VIXX LR was then revealed. Jellyfish confirmed that VIXX LR would be VIXX's first official sub-unit, comprising rapper Ravi and vocalist Leo.

VIXX LR released their debut mini album, Beautiful Liar, on August 17, 2015, and held their first promotional showcase at Yes24 Muv Hall in Hongdae, Mapo-gu, Seoul that same day. They began music show activities on August 18, with a special stage performance of their debut single "Beautiful Liar"on SBS M's The Show. The duo debuted on the Billboard World Albums chart and the South Korean Gaon Album Chart at number two. On September 1, they earned their first music show win on SBS MTV's The Show, with 9,464 votes, the second-highest all-time score in the program's history, only behind parent group VIXX's "Error". On September 4, 2015, VIXX LR wrapped up their three week promotional cycle for Beautiful Liar on KBS2's Music Bank with a goodbye stage performance.

"Beautiful Liar" was nominated for two awards at the 2015 Mnet Asian Music Awards for Best Collaboration and Unit and Song of the Year. In January 2016 VIXX LR held showcase performances in Nagoya, Tokyo and Osaka as part of their first live showcase tour Beautiful Liar in Japan.

On July 19, 2017, Jellyfish Entertainment announced that VIXX LR is aiming to make a comeback and release a new album in August. On August 14, VIXX LR announced that their second mini album Whisper would be released on August 28, 2017.

VIXX LR announced their first concert tour, Eclipse, in October 2017. The first two shows, collectively titled Eclipse in Seoul, were held on November 18 and 19 at the Olympic Hall in Seoul. On January 24, 2018, VIXX LR released their first compilation album, Complete LR, in Japan. The album contained all tracks from both of their previously released mini-albums, plus two new songs, one of which was a Japanese version of "Whisper". The duo held the final three shows of the Eclipse tour in Tokyo, on January 25, and Osaka, on January 27 and 28 respectively.

On April 11, 2023, Ravi announced that he had departed from VIXX following the corruption issue related to his military service, thereby ending the duo sub-unit.

== Discography ==
=== Extended plays ===
Title	Details	Peak chart positions					Sales
Title	Details	KOR	JPN	TW	US Heat	US World	Sales
Beautiful Liar	Released: August 17, 2015; Label: Jellyfish Entertainment; Format: CD, digital download	2	—	1	18	2	KOR: 138,267
Whisper	Released: August 28, 2017; Label: Jellyfish; Format: CD, digital download	1	91	5	—	2	KOR: 78,841; JPN: 630
"—" denotes releases that did not chart or were not released in that region.

=== Compilation albums ===
Title	Details	Peak chart positions	Sales
Title	Details	JPN	Sales
Complete LR	Released: January 24, 2018; Label: Jellyfish Entertainment, Victor Entertainment; Format: CD, digital download	18	JPN: 4,774
"—" denotes releases that did not chart or were not released in that region.

=== Singles ===
Title	Year	Peak chart positions		Sales	Album
Title	Year	KOR Gaon	US World	Sales	Album
"Beautiful Liar"	2015	21	8	KOR (DL): 115,190	Beautiful Liar
"Whisper"	2017	66	9	KOR (DL): 21,968	Whisper
"—" denotes releases that did not chart or were not released in that region.

=== Other charted songs ===
Title	Year	Peak chart positions	Album
Title	Year	KOR Gaon	Album
"Remember"	2015	92 (Note: "Remember" also entered the Download Chart at number 71.)	Beautiful Liar
"Words to Say"	2015	97 (Note: "Words to Say" also entered the Download Chart at number 74.)	Beautiful Liar
"My Light" (Note: "My Light" was recorded by VIXX as a whole.)	2015	— (Note: "My Light" did not enter the Gaon Digital Chart, but peaked at number 91 on the Download Chart.)	Beautiful Liar

=== Music videos ===
Name of music video, year released, director, and additional notes
Title	Year	Director	Note(s)	Ref(s)
"Beautiful Liar"	2015	Su-ah Hwang	Debut music video. Portrays the contrasting emotions felt by a man (played by Leo) dealing with separation due to a breakup. His internal conflict is presented as dual personalities with opposing egos. Ravi portrays the stronger, more provocative persona while Leo portrays the softer, more emotional side. The beach scenes were filmed in Eulwang-ri.	
"Whisper"	2017	Su-ah Hwang	A blue (Leo) and red (Ravi) color theme is used to represent the conflicting emotions of coolness and passion experienced in youth. A dance sequence between the two takes place at the end.	

== Concerts ==
- 2015: VIXX LR Beautiful Liar Showcase
- 2016: VIXX LR 1st LIVE SHOWCASE TOUR Beautiful Liar in Japan
- 2017: VIXX LR 1st Concert Eclipse in Seoul, Tokyo and Osaka
- 2018: VIXX LR Eclipse in Europe

== Achievements ==
=== Awards and nominations ===
Year	Award	Category	Recipient	Result
2015	Mnet Asian Music Awards	Best Collaboration and Unit	"Beautiful Liar"	Nominated
2015	Mnet Asian Music Awards	Song of the Year	"Beautiful Liar"	Nominated
2015	KMC Radio Awards	Best Sub-unit/Collaboration	"Beautiful Liar"	Won
2015	KMC Radio Awards	Song of the Year	"Beautiful Liar"	Nominated
