= Kiggen =

South Korean rapper and record producer

- 이기원
- Born: Lee Ki-won; March 13, 1979 (age 47); Busan, South Korea
- Occupations: Rapper; singer; lyricist; composer; record producer
- Musical career
- Genre: Hip hop
- Instruments: Vocals; keyboards
- Years active: 2007–present
- Labels: Brand New Music; Korean Roulette; Starship Entertainment (Starship X)

- Korean name
- Hangul: 이기원
- RR: I Giwon
- MR: I Kiwŏn

Lee Ki-won (Korean: 이기원; born March 13, 1979), better known by his stage name Kiggen (키겐), is a South Korean rapper, singer, lyricist, composer, and record producer who is a former member of the hip hop group Phantom and the president of the Brand New Music label Korean Roulette.

== Discography ==
=== Studio albums ===
Title	Album details	Peak chart positions	Sales
Title	Album details	KOR	Sales
Pianissimo (피아니시모)	Released: November 27, 2007; Label: Gap Entertainment, NHN Entertainment; Formats: CD, digital download	—	—N/a
"—" denotes releases that did not chart.

=== Extended plays ===
Title	Album details	Peak chart positions	Sales
Title	Album details	KOR	Sales
Song For the Night (밤에 듣기 좋은 노래)	Released: August 22, 2016; Label: Brand New Music, LOEN Entertainment; Formats: CD, digital download	84	—N/a
Cloudy (흐림)	Released: November 15, 2017; Label: Brand New Music, LOEN Entertainment; Formats: CD, digital download	—	—N/a
The Piano	Released: April 19, 2018; Label: Korean Roulette, Warner Music; Formats: CD, digital download	—	—N/a
Lakulaku Bed (라꾸라꾸침대)	Released: August 15, 2019; Label: Korean Roulette, Genie Music; Formats: CD, digital download	—	—N/a
"—" denotes releases that did not chart.

=== Singles ===
Title	Year	Peak chart positions	Sales	Album
Title	Year	KOR	Sales	Album
As lead artist
"Look Again" (다시보기) feat. Jinsil of Mad Soul Child & Hanhae	2015	92	KOR: 23,917	Song For the Night
"Go To The Limit" (선을 넘자) feat. Basick, Ja Mezz & Esbee	2015	—	—N/a	Song For the Night
"I Feel Better" (버려진 기분) feat. Eluphant, Ravi & Esbee	2016	—	—N/a	Song For the Night
"3AM" (밤에 들어줘) feat. Suran & Hanhae	2016	—	KOR: 14,338	Song For the Night
"Prada Shoes" feat. Esbee	2016	—	—N/a	Cloudy
"Cloudy" feat. Solar	2017	—	—N/a	Cloudy
"Starlight Love"	2018	—	—N/a	THE PIANO
"Streaming" feat. Rick Bridges	2018	—	—N/a	STREAMING
"Melancholy" (우울증) feat. MOOK	2018	—	—N/a	Non-album single
"Alcoholic" (취했나봐) feat. Gyepy, Jang Seok-Hoon	2019	—	—N/a	Alcoholic
"Lakulaku Bed" (라꾸라꾸침대)	2019	—	—N/a	Lakulaku Bed
"Gwangan Bridge" (광안대교)	2019	—	—N/a	Non-album singles
"Winner Stays" (사회적 거리두기)	2020	—	—N/a	Non-album singles
Collaborations
"Time Remains as Regret" (시간은 후회로 남아 후회로 남겨진 시간) with Kirots	2007	—	—N/a	Non-album singles
"For the Last of My Life" (두고두고) with Yang Da-il	2016	—	—N/a	Non-album singles
"Starlight Love 2017" (별들도 눈감은밤) with SBGB	2017	—	—N/a	Non-album singles
"Starlight No More" (별들도 눈감은 밤에) with SBGB	2020	—	—N/a	Non-album singles
"—" denotes releases that did not chart.
