= Leo (singer) =

South Korean singer and actor (born 1990)

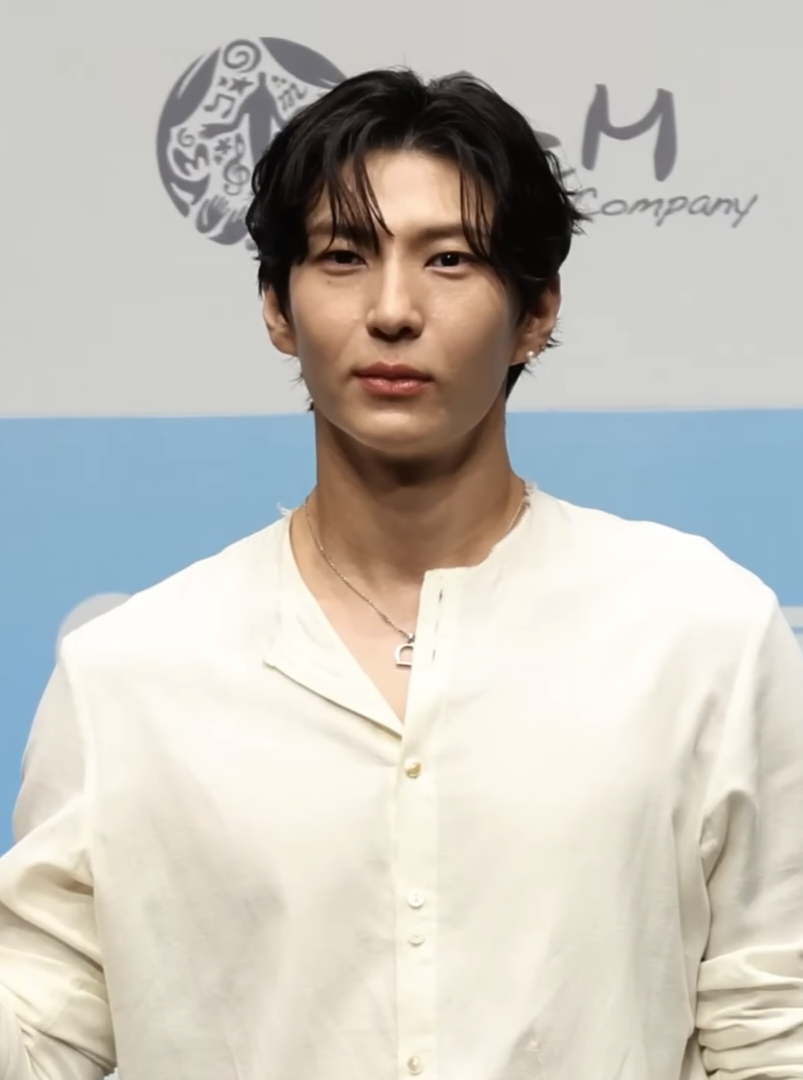
- Leo in 2026
- Born: Jung Taek-woon; November 10, 1990 (age 36); Seoul, South Korea
- Education: Baekseok University
- Occupations: Singer; songwriter; actor
- Musical career
- Genres: K-pop; dance; R&B
- Instruments: Vocals; keyboards
- Years active: 2012–present
- Labels: SUBLIME; Big Boss (until March 2026); Jellyfish (until 2024)
- Member of: VIXX; VIXX LR

Korean name
- Hangul: 정택운
- RR: Jeong Taekun
- MR: Chŏng T'aegun

Jung Taek-woon (Korean: 정택운; born on November 10, 1990), known professionally as Leo (Korean: 레오), is a South Korean singer, songwriter and musical theatre actor, formerly signed under Jellyfish Entertainment. Leo debuted as a member of the South Korean boy group VIXX in May 2012, and began his acting career in 2014 in the musical Full House as Lee Young-jae. In 2015 he began his songwriting career, and with VIXX member Ravi formed the group's first official sub-unit VIXX LR.

== Early life ==
Born in Gwangju, he moved to Yangjae-dong, Seoul, South Korea when he was 49 days old, his family consists of himself, his parents and three older sisters. Leo studied music composition at Baekseok University and was a member of the National Youth Soccer Players from 2004 to 2007. Growing up, Leo was actively involved in swimming, boxing, taekwondo (blue belt), and soccer. While recovering from an injury, he developed an interest in becoming a singer after listening to Wheesung's "Walking in the Sky".

== Career ==
=== 2012–2014: Career beginnings ===
Leo was one of ten trainees who were contestants in Mnet's survival reality show MyDOL. Leo was one of the six contestants who were chosen to be a part of the final line-up of the new boy group VIXX. The group debuted with "Super Hero" on May 24, 2012 on M! Countdown. During MyDOL, Leo was featured in Brian Joo's "Let This Die" and Seo In-guk's "Shake It Up" music videos. After his debut with VIXX, Leo appeared in episode 4 of SBS' television drama The Heirs alongside his group members.

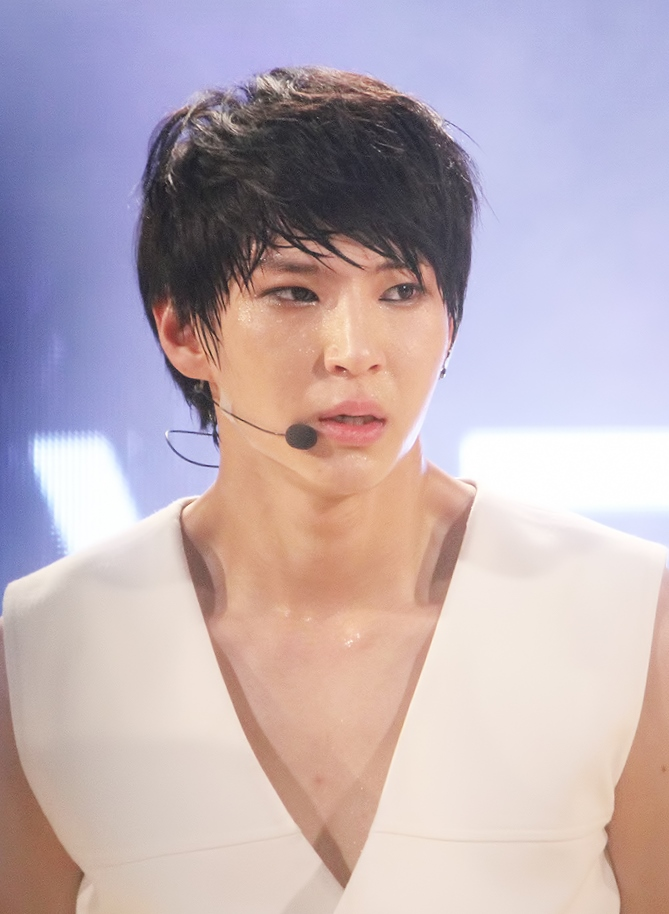
Leo performing in 2013

As an avid sports fan, Leo has appeared in several athletic variety shows with other idols such as Dream Team and Idol Athletics Championship.

In 2014, Leo had a cameo role in SBS' television drama Glorious Day alongside Hyuk and was cast in the musical Full House in the lead role of Lee Young-jae from April to June at the Hongik Daehakro Art Center, Grand Theater in Seoul. Later that year, Leo also participated in the Y.Bird from Jellyfish Island project created by Jellyfish Entertainment CEO Hwang Se-jun by collaborating with Lyn on her self-composed single "Blossom Tears" (Korean: 꽃잎놀이); their single Y.BIRD from Jellyfish with LYn X Leo was the fourth in the series. In the haunting music video, he played a psychopath who killed the women he loved so that he could keep them.

=== 2015–2016: Composing, VIXX LR and musical ===
In 2015, Leo composed the song "On a Cold Night" (Korean: 차가운 밤에) for VIXX's fifth single album Boys' Record. Originally written as a duet between him and Ken, a studio version was released with the rest of the members performing for that album.

On August 7, 2015, Jellyfish Entertainment released a video trailer on VIXX's official website after a mysterious countdown with a silhouette of VIXX's last special album Boys' Record. As time went by, members of VIXX disappeared until finally only, Leo and Ravi were left behind, which caused fans to speculate that it meant another comeback for all six members. A video trailer of VIXX LR was then revealed.

VIXX LR was confirmed by Jellyfish Entertainment to be VIXX's first official sub-unit composed of rapper Ravi and vocalist Leo. Their debut EP, Beautiful Liar, was released on August 17, 2015. On the same day VIXX LR held their first showcase for Beautiful Liar at Yes24 Muv Hall in Seoul′s Mapo-gu.

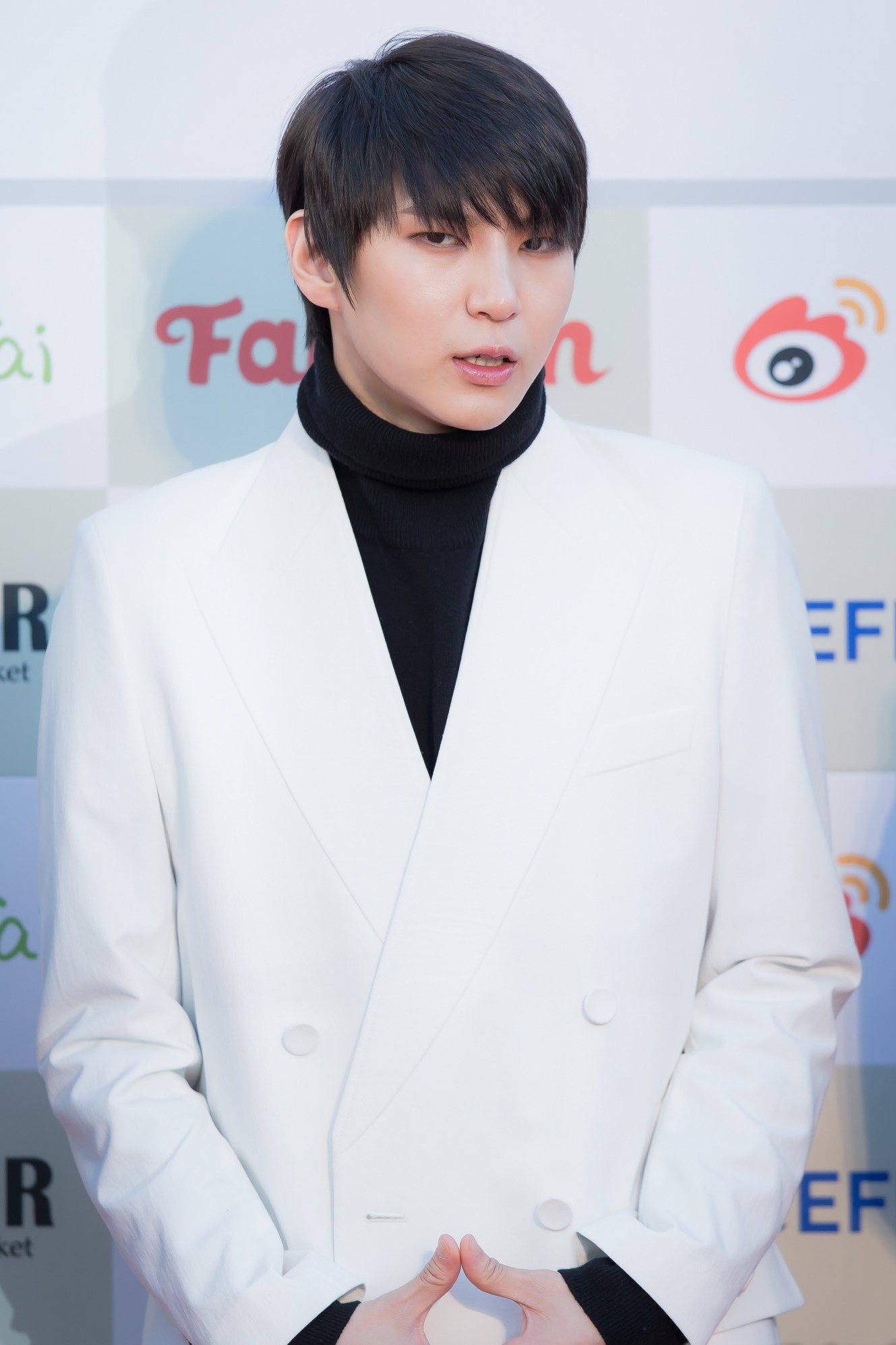
Leo at the 2016 Gaon Chart K-pop Awards

In 2016 Leo was cast in the musical Mata Hari in the lead role of Armand from March 25 to June 12 at the Blue Square in Seoul. It was confirmed that he would be shedding his stage name and using his birth name Jung Taek Woon for the role instead, unlike his previous musical role in Full House where he was credited as Leo.

On September 20, 2016, Leo collaborated with actress and DJ Park So-hyun to celebrate SBS Power FM's 20th Anniversary and released the song "That's All" (Korean: 그뿐야) as part of SBS Power FM's 20th Anniversary song project.

Leo was cast in the musical Monte Cristo in the supporting role of Albert from November 19, 2016, to February 12, 2017, at the Chungmu Arts Center Grand Theater.

=== 2017–present: Solo debut ===
On October 16, 2017, it was announced that Leo had been cast in the musical The Last Kiss as Crown Prince Rudolf.

On July 21, 2018, it was announced that Leo will be releasing his first solo EP titled Canvas on July 31, 2018.

From August 31 to September 2, Leo had his first ever solo concert "LEO 1st SOLO CONCERT [CANVAS]" which was held at Blue Square Eye Market Hall

On May 14, 2019, Leo announced about his "2nd Solo Concert [MUSE]" which was in June 2019. Leo's second EP Muse was released on June 17. On August 3, 2022, Leo released a teaser video of Coming Soon through his official YouTube and SNS channels.

On March 3, 2024, Jellyfish Entertainment announced that Leo and fellow VIXX member Ken were leaving the agency, but intended to continue their activities with VIXX. After leaving Jellyfish Entertainment, Leo signed with Big Boss Entertainment and continued his musical theatre career, appearing as Anatole Kuragin in Great Comet and in Buchihanan. He subsequently appeared in the musicals Memphis and Sugar in 2025.

In 2026, Leo signed with SUBLIME after his contract with Big Boss Entertainment ended. He appeared as Cell 109 in the musical Yumi's Cells.. On October 1, he released the digital single "Never Again", his first solo release since the extended play Piano man Op. 9 in 2022. He wrote the lyrics and co-composed the song. In the same month, he held the solo fan meeting TAKE 운 – PLAY LEO in Seoul. In October 30, 2026, Leo was cast in Numéro deux (두 번째 아이), a one-man musical adaptation of the novel written by David Foenkinos. Leo will appear on stage from December 2026–January 2027.

== Personal life ==
Leo enlisted for his mandatory military service on December 2, 2019, serving as a public service worker due to severe panic disorder and depression. He was discharged on September 9, 2021.

== Discography ==
=== Extended plays ===
| Title | Details | Peak chart positions | | | Sales |
| Title | Details | KOR | TW | US World | Sales |
|---|---|---|---|---|---|
| Canvas | Released: July 31, 2018; Label: Jellyfish Entertainment, CJ E&M; Formats: CD, digital download; Track list: 1. "Touch & Sketch"; 2. "Cover Girl" (Feat. LE); 3. "Free Tempo"; 4. "Give Me Something"; 5. "Nowadays" (나는 요즘); 6. "Gesture"; 7. "Dream" (꿈) | 2 | 5 | 7 | KOR: 45,094 |
| Muse | Released: June 17, 2019; Label: Jellyfish Entertainment; Formats: CD, digital download; Track listing: 1. "Romanticism" (로맨티시즘); 2. "This About to Happen" (다가오는 것들) (feat. Choiza); 3. "Nostalgia" (향수병); 4. "Tight" (타이트해); 5. "Muse"; 6. "The Flower" (feat. Maximilian Hecker) | 6 | — | — | KOR: 32,634 |
| Piano Man Op.9 | Released: August 23, 2022; Label: Jellyfish Entertainment, Kakao M; Formats: CD, digital download; Track listing: 1. "Beautiful Love"; 2. "Losing Game"; 3. "So Easy"; 4. "Chilling"; 5. "Blue Rain" | 8 | — | — | KOR: 29,189 |
"—" denotes releases that did not chart or were not released in that region.

=== Singles ===
| Title | Year | Peak chart position | Sales | Album |
| Title | Year | KOR | Sales | Album |
As lead artist
| "Touch & Sketch" | 2018 | — (Note: "Touch & Sketch" did not enter the Circle Digital Chart, but peaked at number 60 on the component Download Chart.) | —N/a | Canvas |
| "You Are There, But Not There" (있는데 없는 너) (feat. Hanhae) | 2018 | — | —N/a | Non-album single |
| "The Flower" (feat. Maximilian Hecker) | 2019 | — | —N/a | Muse |
| "Romanticism" (로맨티시즘) | 2019 | — (Note: "Romanticism" did not enter the Circle Digital Chart, but peaked at number 146 on the component Download Chart.) | —N/a | Muse |
| "All of Me" | 2019 | — | —N/a | Non-album singles |
| "December, The Night of Dreams" (12월 꿈의 밤) | 2019 | — | —N/a | Non-album singles |
| "I'm Still Here" (남아있어) | 2021 | — | —N/a | Non-album singles |
| "Losing Game" | 2022 | — (Note: "Losing Game" did not enter the Circle Digital Chart, but peaked at number 55 on the component Download Chart.) | —N/a | Piano Man Op.9 |
| "Never Again" | 2026 | — | —N/a | Non-album singles |
Collaborations
| "Blossom Tears" (꽃잎놀이) (with LYn) | 2014 | 11 | KOR: 156,798 | Y.BIRD from Jellyfish with LYn X Leo |
| "That's All" (그뿐야) (Note: "That's All" was Part 2 of SBS Power FM's 20th Anniversary Song Project.) (with Park So-hyun) | 2016 | — | —N/a | Non-album single |
| "We, the Reds" (우리는 하나) (with Sejeong) | 2018 | — | —N/a | 2018 National Football Team Cheering Album 'We, the Reds' |
| "Feel Love" | 2019 | — | —N/a | Space Project (공간) part 3. |
Soundtrack appearances
| "Der letzte Tanz" (마지막 춤) | 2019 | — | —N/a | Musical Elizabeth 2018 |
"—" denotes releases that did not chart or were not released in that region.

=== Compilation appearances ===
| Title | Year | Peak chart position | Sales | Album |
| Title | Year | KOR | Sales | Album |
|---|---|---|---|---|
| "The Last Game" (마지막 승부) (with Rich) | 2016 | — | —N/a | King of Mask Singer Episode 49 |
| "To Heaven" | 2016 | — | —N/a | King of Mask Singer Episode 50 |
"—" denotes releases that did not chart or were not released in that reg

=== Songwriting credits ===
All song credits are adapted from the Korea Music Copyright Association's database unless stated otherwise.

| Year | Album | Song | Artist | Lyrics | | Composition | | Arrangement | | Notes/Ref. |
| Year | Album | Song | Artist | Credited | With | Credited | With | Credited | With | Notes/Ref. |
|---|---|---|---|---|---|---|---|---|---|---|
| 2015 | Boys' Record | "On a Cold Night" | VIXX | Yes | Ravi (rap) | Yes | MELODESIGN | No | MELODESIGN | |
| 2015 | Beautiful Liar | "Words to Say" | VIXX LR | Yes | —N/a | Yes | MELODESIGN | No | MELODESIGN | |
| 2015 | Beautiful Liar | "My Light" | VIXX LR | Yes | Ravi | Yes | MELODESIGN | No | MELODESIGN | |
| 2016 | Depend on Me | "Shadow" | VIXX | Yes | Ravi | Yes | Cho Yong-ho | No | —N/a | Limited Edition A Bonus Track |
| 2016 | Hana-Kaze (花風) | "Moonlight" | VIXX | Yes | Ravi | Yes | Cho Yong-ho | No | —N/a | |
| 2016 | That's All | "That's All" | Leo x Park So-hyun | Yes | —N/a | Yes | Cho Yong-ho | Yes | Cho Yong-ho | |
| 2016 | Kratos | "Romance is Over" | VIXX | Yes | Ravi | Yes | Cho Yong-ho | No | Cho Yong-ho | |
| 2017 | Whisper | "Beautiful Night" | VIXX LR | Yes | Ravi | Yes | Lim Shae-sung, Hyun Jae-wook | No | Lim Shae-sung, Hyun Jae-wook | |
| 2017 | Whisper | "Feeling" | VIXX LR | Yes | Ravi | Yes | Lim Shae-sung, Hyun Jae-wook | No | Lim Shae-sung, Hyun Jae-wook | |
| 2017 | VIXX LR Concert — Eclipse | "어려운 일" | VIXX LR | Yes | Ravi | Yes | Cho Yong-ho | Yes | Cho Yong-ho | |
| 2017 | VIXX LR Concert — Eclipse | "Poison" | VIXX LR | Yes | Ravi | Yes | Ravi, B-Rock, Jade Key, J-Lin | No | B-Rock, Jade Key, J-Lin | |
| 2017 | VIXX Fantasia Elysium DVD | "Trap" | Leo | Yes | —N/a | Yes | Cho Yong-ho | No | —N/a | |
| 2017 | VIXX Live Fantasia DVD | "Up In The Sky" | Leo | Yes | —N/a | Yes | Lim Shae-sung, Hyun Jae-wook, Kim Tae-hoon | No | Lim Shae-sung, Hyun Jae-wook, Kim Tae-hoon | |
| 2018 | Canvas | "Touch & Sketch" | Leo | Yes | —N/a | No | Andreas Stone Johansson, Matt Wong, Jamie Jones, G'harah "PK" Degeddingseze | No | —N/a | |
| 2018 | Canvas | "Cover Girl" (ft. LE) | Leo | Yes | LE (rap) | Yes | Hyun Jae-wook, Kim Tae-hoon | No | Hyun Jae-wook, Kim Tae-hoon | |
| 2018 | Canvas | "Free Tempo" | Leo | Yes | —N/a | Yes | Lim Shae-sung, Hyun Jae-wook | No | Lim Shae-sung, Hyun Jae-wook | |
| 2018 | Canvas | "Give me something" | Leo | Yes | Kevin Charge, Justin Reinstein | No | Kevin Charge, Justin Reinstein | No | —N/a | |
| 2018 | Canvas | "Nowadays" (나는 요즘) | Leo | Yes | —N/a | Yes | Ryan IM | No | Ryan IM | |
| 2018 | Canvas | "Gesture" | Leo | Yes | —N/a | Yes | Lim Shae-sung, Hyun Jae-wook | No | Lim Shae-sung, Hyun Jae-wook | |
| 2018 | Canvas | "Dream" (꿈) | Leo | Yes | —N/a | Yes | Hyun Jae-wook | No | Hyun Jae-wook | |
| 2018 | Leo 1st Concert — Canvas | "있는데 없는 너 (You're There, But Not There)" | Leo | Yes | —N/a | Yes | Ryan IM | No | Ryan IM | |
| 2018 | "있는데 없는 너 (You're There, But Not There)" | "있는데 없는 너 (You're There, But Not There)" (ft. Hanhae) | Leo | Yes | Hanhae | Yes | Ryan IM | No | Ryan IM | |
| 2019 | The Flower | "The Flower" (ft. Maximilian Hecker) | Leo | Yes | Maximilian Hecker | No | Maximilian Hecker | No | —N/a | |
| 2019 | December, The Night of Dreams (12월 꿈의 밤) | "December, The Night of Dreams" (12월 꿈의 밤) | Leo | Yes | —N/a | Yes | Ryan Im, Ejo | No | Ryan Im, Ejo | |
| 2019 | All of Me | "All of Me" | Leo | Yes | —N/a | Yes | Ryan Im, Lee Min-ho | No | Ryan Im, Lee Min-ho | |
| 2019 | Muse | "Muse" | Leo | Yes | —N/a | Yes | Ryan Im, Ejo | No | Ryan Im, Ejo | |
| 2019 | Muse | "Romanticism" | Leo | Yes | —N/a | No | Cho Yong-ho, Nate Davey | No | —N/a | |
| 2019 | Muse | "타이트해 (Tight)" | Leo | Yes | —N/a | Yes | Ryan Im, Ejo, Woncha | No | Ryan Im, Ejo, Woncha | |
| 2019 | Muse | "향수병 (Nostalgia)" | Leo | Yes | —N/a | Yes | Ryan Im, Ejo | No | Ryan Im, Ejo | |
| 2019 | Muse | "다가오는 것들 (This About to Happen)" (ft. Choiza of Dynamic Duo) | Leo | Yes | Choiza | Yes | Ryan Im, Ejo | No | Ryan Im, Ejo | |
| 2021 | I'm Still Here (남아있어) | "I'm Still Here" | Leo | Yes | Kim Tae-ju | Yes | Kim Tae-ju | Yes | Kim Tae-ju | |
| 2022 | Piano Man Op. 9 | "So Easy" | Leo | Yes | —N/a | Yes | Ryan Im, Ejo | No | Ryan Im, Ejo | |
| 2022 | Piano Man Op. 9 | "Beautiful Love" | Leo | Yes | —N/a | Yes | Ryan Im, Ejo | No | Ryan Im, Ejo | |
| 2022 | Piano Man Op. 9 | "Blue Rain" | Leo | Yes | —N/a | Yes | Ryan Im, Lyk Kyum | No | Ryan Im, Lyk Kyum | |
| 2022 | Piano Man Op. 9 | "Chilling" | Leo | Yes | —N/a | Yes | Ryan Im, Ejo | No | Ryan Im, Ejo | |
| 2022 | Piano Man Op. 9 | "Losing Game" | Leo | Yes | Kim Tae-ju | Yes | Kim Tae-ju, Jimmy Mathias Claeson | No | —N/a | |
| 2023 | Continuum | "Chemical" | VIXX | Yes | Kang Eun-jeong | No | Hotsauce, Lee Woo-min, Justin Robert Reinstein | No | —N/a | |
| 2023 | Continuum | "If You Come Tonight" | VIXX | Yes | Ryan Im | No | Ryan Im, Ejo, Katchy, Uknow | No | —N/a | |
| 2026 | Never Again | "Never Again" | Leo | Yes | —N/a | Yes | Ryan IM, Ejo IM, KATCHY, Chaeyoung Kim | No | —N/a | |

== Filmography ==
=== Television series ===
| Year | Title | Role | Notes | Ref. |
|---|---|---|---|---|
| 2014 | The Heirs | Himself | Cameo ep. 4 | |

=== Web series ===
| Year | Title | Role | Ref. |
|---|---|---|---|
| 2022 | Happy Ending Outside the Fence | Kim Jung-hyun | |

=== Television shows ===
| Year | Title | Role | Notes | Ref. |
|---|---|---|---|---|
| 2016 | King of Mask Singer | Contestant as "Heungbu Be Stifled" | Episodes 49–50 | |
| 2017 | Singing Battle – Victory | Contestant | Episodes 16–17 | |

== Musicals ==
| Year | Title | Role | Notes | Ref. |
|---|---|---|---|---|
| 2014 | Full House | Lee Young-jae | Lead role, musical version | |
| 2016–17 | Mata Hari | Armand | Lead role, Korean version; Returned for a second run in 2017 | |
| 2016–17 | Monte Cristo | Albert | Supporting role, Korean version | |
| 2017–18 | The Last Kiss | Prince Rudolf | Lead role, Korean version | |
| 2018–19 | Elisabeth | Der Tod | Lead role, Korean version | |
| 2019 | Marie Antoinette | Count Axel Von Fersen | Lead role, Korean version | |
| 2021 | Frankenstein | Henri Dupre | Korean version | |
| 2022 | Bungee Jumping of Their Own | Seo In-woo | | |
| 2022–23 | West Side Story | Riff | Korean version | |
| 2023-24 | Tebas Land | Martín Santos, Federico | Lead role, Korean version | |
| 2024 | Great Comet | Anatole Kuragin | Lead role, Korean version | |
| 2024 | Buchihanan | Buchihanan, Nuri | Lead role | |
| 2025 | Memphis | Huey Calhoun | Lead role, Korean version | |
| 2025 | Sugar | Joe, Josephine | Lead role, Korean version | |
| 2026 | Yumi's Cells | Cell 109 | Lead role, musical version | |
| 2026-27 | Numéro deux | Martin Hill | One man show musical adaptation | |

== Concerts & live performances ==
| Year | Title | City | Country | Location | Ref. |
|---|---|---|---|---|---|
| 2018 | LEO 1st Solo Concert [CANVAS] | Seoul | South Korea | Blue Square iMarket Hall | |
| 2018 | LEO 1st Solo Concert [CANVAS] | Tokyo | Japan | Zepp Tokyo | |
| 2018 | LEO 1st Solo Concert [CANVAS] | Osaka | Japan | Zepp Namba | |
| 2019 | LEO 2nd Solo Concert [MUSE] | Seoul | South Korea | Blue Square iMarket Hall | |
| 2019 | LEO 2nd Solo Concert [MUSE] | Taipei | Taiwan | ATT SHOWBOX Dazhi Hall | |
| 2019 | LEO 2nd Solo Concert [MUSE] | Tokyo | Japan | Club Citta | |
| 2019 | LEO 2nd Solo Concert [MUSE] | Osaka | Japan | Dojima River Forum | |
| 2019 | LEO 1st Fanmeeting [All of me] | Seoul | South Korea | MUV Hall | |
| 2022 | 2022 LEO Special LIVE [I'm Still Here - And you are] | Seoul | South Korea | Jangchung Arena | |
| 2022 | LEO 3rd Concert Piano man Op. 9 | Seoul | South Korea | KwangWoon University Donghae Arts Center | |
| 2022 | LEO 3rd Concert Piano man Op. 9 | Tokyo | Japan | Club Citta | |
| 2023 | 2023 HAPPY LEO DAY '퇴근 후 택운할레오?' (Do you want to hang out with Taekwoon after work?) | Seoul | South Korea | Yonsei University Centennial Memorial Hall Concert Hall | |
| 2024-25 | 2024 LEO FAN CONCERT 'TAKE 운' | Seoul | South Korea | YES24 Live Hall | |
| 2024-25 | 2024 LEO FAN CONCERT 'TAKE 운' | Tokyo | Japan | Sunshine Theatre | |
| 2024-25 | 2024 LEO FAN CONCERT 'TAKE 운' | Taipei | Taiwan | Clapper Studio | |
| 2025 | MUSE 1st Fanmeeting [TAKE 운 - Stay In My Dream] | Seoul | South Korea | Sungshin Women's University Unjeong Green Campus Grand Hall | |
| 2026 | 2026 LEO MUSE FANMEETING [TAKE 운 – PLAY LEO] | Seoul | South Korea | Sungshin Women's University Unjeong Green Campus Grand Hall | |

=== Festival solo stage performances ===
| Year | Title | City | Country | Location | Ref. |
|---|---|---|---|---|---|
| 2018 | 2018 DMC Festival | Seoul | South Korea | Sangam DMC Culture Plaza | |
| 2025 | Wonderland Festival 2025 | Seoul | South Korea | Grand Peace Palace at Kyung Hee University | |
