= Ravi (rapper) =

South Korean musician (born 1993)

- 라비
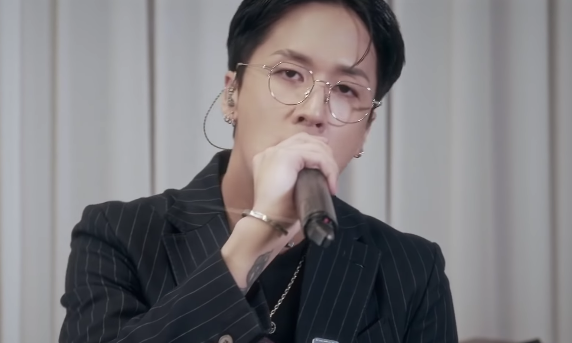
- Ravi in 2020
- Born: Kim Won-sik; February 15, 1993 (age 33); Seoul, South Korea
- Occupations: Rapper; songwriter; record producer
- Musical career
- Genres: Hip hop; K-pop
- Instruments: Vocals; keyboards; sampler
- Years active: 2012–present
- Labels: Jellyfish (until 2019); Groovl1n; The L1ve; Studio GL1DE
- Formerly of: VIXX; VIXX LR

Korean name
- Hangul: 김원식
- RR: Gim Wonsik
- MR: Kim Wŏnsik

Kim Won-sik (Korean: 김원식; born February 15, 1993), better known by his stage name Ravi (라비), is a South Korean rapper, songwriter, record producer, and founder of the record label Groovl1n, The L1VE, and Studio GL1DE. He is a former member of the South Korean boy group VIXX and its sub-unit VIXX LR. He debuted as a solo artist on January 9, 2017, with the release of his debut mini album R.eal1ze.

== Career ==
=== 2012–2013: Debut and project solo activities ===
Ravi was one of ten trainees who were contestants on Mnet's survival reality show MyDOL. During his time on the show, Ravi featured in the music videos for Brian Joo's "Let This Die" and Seo In-guk's "Shake It Up". He eventually became one of six contestants chosen as the final line-up for a new boy group VIXX. VIXX debuted on May 24, 2012, on M! Countdown with the single "Super Hero", which Ravi co-wrote. On June 14 and 15, during "Super Hero" promotions, Ravi participated in Baek Ji-young's performances of her song "Good Boy".

In 2013, he appeared in episode four of SBS's television drama The Heirs alongside his group members.

=== 2014–2015: Collaborations and VIXX LR ===
In 2014, Ravi collaborated with American artist Chad Future with "Rock the World" from Future's first mini album. Ravi also appeared in the music video for the single.

In 2015, after much deliberation, Ravi became a contestant of Mnet's television rap competition series Show Me the Money 4 but was eliminated in the second round. Ravi was featured as a rapper in Rain's Chinese song "Diamond Love" from the soundtrack of the Chinese drama Diamond Lover (克拉戀人).

On August 7, 2015, Jellyfish Entertainment released a video trailer on VIXX's official website after a mysterious countdown with a silhouette of VIXX's last special album Boys' Record. As time went by, members of VIXX disappeared until finally only Leo and Ravi were left behind, which caused fans to speculate that it meant another comeback for all six members. A video trailer of VIXX LR was then revealed.

VIXX LR was confirmed by Jellyfish Entertainment to be VIXX's first official sub-unit composed of main rapper Ravi and main vocalist Leo. Their debut mini album, Beautiful Liar, was released on August 17, 2015. On the same day VIXX LR held their first showcase for Beautiful Liar at Yes24 Muv Hall in Seoul′s Mapo District.

In December 2015, Ravi was featured in the ballad girl group Melody Day's single "When It Rains" (비가 내리면), as part of their Winter Ballad Project.

=== 2016–2019: Solo debut, tours, and establishment of GROOVL1N ===
On January 4, 2016, Ravi revealed the first pre-release to his mixtape R.ebirth, with the track "Where Should I Go" featuring Microdot. The second pre-release "OX" featuring Basick, the winner of Show Me the Money 4, was released on January 20, 2016. The third pre-release "Good Girls" (착한 여자) featuring Hanhae and Soulman was released on February 4, 2016. The fourth and final pre-release "Move" was released on February 22, 2016. All the mixtape pre-releases have been released on VIXX's official YouTube channel and on Ravi's official SoundCloud. On March 4, 2016, the track list was revealed on Ravi's Instagram. The full version of R.ebirth was released on March 12, 2016, available for free as streaming media also on SoundCloud and YouTube. To celebrate the release of R.ebirth, Ravi held a showcase, titled Ravi's 1st Live Party [R.EBIRTH], on March 19 and March 20, 2016, at the Hyundai Card Understage in Seoul. Rappers Basick, Esbee, and DJ/producer SAM&SP3CK attended the show as featured performers and VIXX members Leo, N, Ken, Hongbin and Hyuk also attended as guests.

On July 14, 2016, Ravi participated in Jellyfish Entertainment's new music channel project Jelly Box and released the single "DamnRa" featuring SAM&SP3CK, a DJ/producer duo. "DamnRa" was released along with a performance music video. On September 26, Ravi released a mixtape track titled "Who are U" and featuring Superbee.

On January 4, 2017, Ravi pre-released a single, "Home Alone" (나홀로 집에) featuring Jung Yong-hwa from his upcoming first mini album R.eal1ze. On January 9, 2017, Ravi released his debut mini album R.eal1ze, which contains three tracks from his previous mixtape plus four new tracks including the title track "Bomb" featuring San E. He was the producer, and personally in charge of the composition, arrangement and writing the lyrics of every song. This debut album is followed by a solo concert from January 6 to January 8 at the Yes24 Muv Hall in Seoul's Mapo District.

In 2017, Ravi performed at Rapbeat Show Australia. In July 2017, He also performed at NBA Buzzer Beat Festival in Seoul.

In February 2018, Ravi held his second solo concert RAVI 2nd REAL-LIVE [NIRVANA]. In October and November 2018, Ravi embarked on his first solo European tour, performing in ten cities: Istanbul, Madrid, Vienna, Amsterdam, Brussels, Cologne, Bucharest, Warsaw, London, and Paris.

On February 7, 2019, Ravi and Chungha confirmed that they will release their collaboration on February 18. On the promised day the new single Live was released on various music streaming websites.

On February 22, 2019, Ravi's second mini album R.ook Book was announced to be released on March 5. Ravi had his third solo concert REAL-LIVE R.OOK BOOK which took place at the Yes24 Live Hall in Seoul on March 22 to 24.

In 2019, Ravi performed at Seoul Jazz Festival and Waterbomb Festival in Gwangju. That year, he also joined the cast of the fourth season of KBS's variety show 2 Days & 1 Night, which began airing in December.

On May 24, 2019, Ravi announced his departure from Jellyfish Entertainment following the expiration of his contract, while confirming that he would continue participating in VIXX's group activities. On June 27, he announced the establishment of his own hip-hop label, GROOVL1N.

On November 8, 2019, Ravi released the first part of his third mini album Limitless. The second part of the album was released on November 23.

=== 2020–present: Solo activities, label ventures, departure from VIXX, and return to music ===
On February 24, 2020, Ravi released his first studio album El Dorado, with "Rockstar" as the title track. On July 28, 2020, Ravi released his summer mini album Paradise, along with the title track of the same name featuring Ha Sung-woon.

On June 3, 2021, Ravi released his fourth mini album Roses, along with the title tracks "Flower Garden" and "Cardigan". During this period, he also established the record label THE L1VE in July 2021 and Studio GL1DE in November 2021, expanding his activities into artist management and content production.

On February 8, 2022, Ravi released his second studio album Love&Fight, with "Winner" as the title track featuring Ash Island. On February 21, 2022, Ravi's agency confirmed that his concerts in February were temporarily postponed due to the spread of the coronavirus. In April 2022, Ravi announced that he would resume his convert REVOIR on May 7 and 8, 2022. In May, he also embarked on the 2022 GROOVL1N U.S. Tour with labelmate Xydo, performing in New York City, Chicago, Atlanta, Denver, Dallas, and Los Angeles.

After appearing as a regular cast member for 2 years and 4 months, Ravi departed from KBS variety show 2 Days & 1 Night, in order to prepare for his upcoming military enlistment. His last episode aired on May 1, 2022, and he released a single titled "Who We Are" (Korean: 안녕; RR: Annyeong; lit. 'Goodbye') on the same day as a farewell song.

On August 11, 2022, it was announced that Ravi would release a teaser image of Ravi's new single album 'BYE'. On September 5, 2022, it was announced that Ravi will release the EP album "Love & Holiday", which will be released on September 12. On October 6, 2022, they released their new single "Fashionable Dance", which will be released on October 13.

On April 11, 2023, Ravi announced that he had departed from VIXX following the corruption issue related to his military service.

In June 22, 2026, Ravi released digital single "Dust", his first solo release since 2022. In June 26, 2026, Ravi was also featured on Suen's single release "Girlfriend".

== Record label ventures ==
=== GROOVL1N ===
On June 27, 2019, Ravi revealed via his Twitter and Instagram account the name of his own hip-hop label name GROOVL1N (그루블린) a combination of Groove and Goblin which means "The cool folk of the orient". At that time, the label included Cold Bay, Chillin Homie and Xydo (Park Chi Woong) whom he worked with in the past. Currently, Korean rappers JUSTHIS, NAFLA, the dance crew PRIMEKINGZ, and new artist Suen are included.

=== The L1ve ===
On July 20, 2021, Ravi established his new label, The L1ve. The label aims to support music artists across different genres.

On July 22, 2021, Ailee announced that she would be joining the new label, as their first official artist. On August 31, 2021, it was revealed that Wheein signed an exclusive contract with the agency.

=== Studio GL1DE ===
On November 26, 2021, Ravi established his new label, Studio GL1DE as a subsidiary of GROOVL1N. The label's artists include soloist and entertainer WetBoy and singer Sung Han-bin, the leader of the South Korean boy group Zerobaseone.

Studio GL1DE also collaborated with Needslab G&C to co-produce the Vietnamese version of Mnet's dance competition program Street Woman Fighter.

== Personal life ==
=== Military service ===
On October 7, 2022, Ravi's agency announced that he will enlist for his mandatory military service on October 27. After completing basic training he will complete his service as a social worker.

== Legal issues and controversies ==
=== Suspicion of involvement in the 2022 epilepsy military service corruption case ===
On January 12, 2023, Ravi was named by the media as the rumored idol rapper who availed of the services of military broker Gu Mo to evade enlistment.

Ravi was accused of declaring epilepsy to lower his health to grade 4 in order to serve as a public service worker instead of an active duty soldier. The reason for this suspicion was due to his records being found on Gu Mo's phone, although the content of the records was never specified. That same day Ravi's agency GROOVL1N, released an official statement saying they were closely examining the truth about the situation: "It is only right to give a statement as quickly as possible, but since the problem is related to military duty, we think it is only appropriate to first find out the details and then give thorough explanations after, so we are currently trying to figure out the details. In addition, if there is a request for an investigation related to this case, [Ravi] will undergo it faithfully at any time." At this point, Ravi had been enlisted as a public service worker since October 27, 2022, and did not make any official statements until his first trial on April 11, 2023.

On February 9, prosecutors indicted 47 people for military service corruption. 42 people who admitted to falsifying medical certificates for epilepsy as well as 5 family members and acquaintances who served as accomplices were charged with violating the Military Service Act. Ravi was notably excluded from the indictments. The current representative of Ravi's agency Park Sung Kyu gave an official statement, saying that contrary to initial reports, Ravi was never even contacted by the prosecution or informed of his official charges. He further stated that Ravi did not receive a health grade of 4 due to epilepsy, which meant that Ravi did not use epilepsy as a reason to evade serving as an active duty soldier. Ravi had other valid health conditions that disqualified him from active duty service.

On March 6, Chief Judge Kim Ji-sook of the Seoul Southern District Court conducted a pre-arrest interrogation of Ravi, and rejected an arrest warrant submitted by the prosecutors, stating that Ravi posed no risk of fleeing or destroying evidence.

On April 3, Ravi was officially indicted by the prosecution. Prosecutors leaked the reports of his official medical examinations conducted by the Military Manpower Administration. The report revealed that Ravi had originally received a health grade of 3 during his first examination in 2012 due to bronchial asthma. By the time of Ravi's second examination in 2019, his health had already downgraded to grade 4. The leaked medical reports revealed that as early as 2019, Ravi was not qualified to serve as an active duty soldier due to various health conditions.

Ravi had multiple disabilities that disqualified him from active duty. He has narcolepsy, panic disorder, compulsive disorder, depression and bronchial asthma. There are many instances since his debut in 2012 where his various conditions have been mentioned publicly.

Ravi's narcolepsy was mentioned by the interviewer in this early news article from Sports Hanguk just 1 week after he debuted in 2012. Ravi later mentioned his narcolepsy himself in a Vogue Girl interview from November 2012. There are multiple clips of Ravi's narcolepsy during VIXX's reality shows MyDOL and MTV VIXX Diary that were filmed in 2012. In 2020, Ravi mentions on DinDin's SBS Music High radio show that his narcolepsy used to be so bad, he would fall asleep while being scolded. As a member of Season 4 of the KBS variety show 2 Days & 1 Night from 2019 to 2022, there were also various clips showing Ravi's narcolepsy while filming the show.

Ravi released the song "Live" (featuring Chungha) on February 18, 2019, to speak about his depression, panic disorder, and struggles with contemplating suicide.

Last May 2022 on their official YouTube channel, VIXX members discussed Ravi's panic disorder occurring as early as 2016. Ravi suffered a panic attack that lasted for hours, delaying the filming of their music video The Closer. In 2018, Ravi suffered a panic attack and collapsed while filming the MBC variety show Real Man 300. Ravi mentioned he suffered from panic disorder on episode 768 of the MBC TV series Radio Star Ravi's interview with GQ Korea in February 2020 revealed that in 2019, he was diagnosed with panic disorder and compulsive disorder.

Ravi talked about his compulsive disorder on episode 97 of the MBC talk show Video Star in 2018. On episode 66 of the KBS variety show 2 Days & 1 Night, Ravi confides about his panic disorder and compulsive disorder to cast member Yeon Jung Hoon. Ravi's goodbye letter on his last episode of 2 days & 1 Night also mentions his depression and panic disorder.

On April 3, Dong A Ilbo released an exclusive report on Ravi's indictment from the office of Rep. Jeon Ju Hye of the Ministry of Justice. They revealed that it was the co-CEO of GROOVL1N, only named by the media as CEO A, who contacted broker Gu Mo seeking a postponement for Ravi and an exemption for rapper Nafla. CEO A signed the contract with Gu Mo, and it was his messages not Ravi's that were found on Gu Mo's phone. Gu Mo sent a text message to CEO A saying, "Good, it's an exemption." There has been no evidence provided of Ravi directly contacting or seeking out Broker Gu Mo himself.

On April 11, Ravi attended the first hearing of his trial. The trial revealed that Ravi was unaware that he had even received an exemption from the Military Manpower Administration. Ravi submitted his own application for enlistment in September 2022 and entered the training camp on October 27, 2022. Ravi enlisted as a public service worker and did not proceed with evasion as he did not know he had received an exemption. Thus, he was initially unaware that he had committed a crime. However, Ravi also apologized to patients suffering from epilepsy and chose to accept all charges by the prosecution. Ravi also withdrew from his idol group VIXX.

This trial revealed that in 2020, Ravi was faced with a large contract penalty for an event he was unable to fulfill due to the COVID-19 global pandemic. The penalty was so large that Ravi's self-founded company GROOVL1N, was likely to close. Ravi had initially applied to postpone his enlistment to fulfill his contractual obligations in February 2021. At this point Ravi had been paying for the salaries of his employees out of his own pocket for over a year. Prosecutors revealed that this was also the time that co-CEO Kim contacted broker Gu Mo, initially seeking his help for a postponement for Ravi.

On August 10, the court found Ravi guilty of violating the Military Service Act and sentenced him to a 1-year suspended prison sentence. He did not go to prison, but instead received 2 years of probation and 120 hours of community service. Ravi also volunteered to enlist in military service twice. He will be required to undergo another health evaluation to determine if he will continue to be in public service for his second enlistment.

Ravi completed his enlistment as a Grade 4 social service worker according to the Military of Manpower Association's evaluation of his medical records in December 2025. He confirmed this in his public statement on his official Instagram account

== Discography ==
=== Studio albums ===
Title	Details	Peak chart positions	Sales
Title	Details	KOR Gaon	Sales
El Dorado	Released: February 24, 2020; Label: Groovl1n, Genie Music, Stone Music Entertainment; Format: CD, digital download, streaming; Track list: 1. "El Dorado (Prod. Puff); 2. "Po$ei (feat. Khundi Panda) (Prod. Puff); 3. "Dream Catcher" (feat. Reddy, Bill Stax) (Prod. Flash Note); 4. "Lo-fi" (feat. Sik-K) (Prod. Flash Note, Puff); 5. "Rockstar" (feat. Paloalto) (Prod. Yuth); 6. "Goddess" (feat. Xydo) (Prod. Clam); 7. "Yeopo" (여포 (呂布)) (feat. Rohann, Chillin Homie) (Prod. QuizQuiz); 8. "Doberman" (feat. G2) (Prod. Flash Note); 9. "Full Time Digga" (feat. sokodomo, Raf Sandou) (Prod. Flash Note); 10. "Knife Dance" (칼춤 (劍舞)) (feat. Xydo, Cold Bay, Chillin Homie) (Prod. Clam); 11. "Where Am I" (Groovl1n Remix) (Bonus track)	5	KOR: 7,583
Love & Fight	Released: February 8, 2022; Label: Groovl1n, Warner Music Korea; Format: CD, digital download, streaming; Track list: 1. "Guns"; 2. "Virus" (feat. Justhis); 3. "Winner" (feat. Ash Island); 4. "Love Hate Fight" (feat. Nafla); 5. "What's My Problem"; 6. "Let Me Down Slowly" (feat. Cold Bay); 7. "Drowning in the Rain"; 8. "1,2,3" (feat. Xydo); 9. "Cannonball" (feat. Paul Blanco); 10. "Ani" (feat. Jeon So-yeon of (G)I-dle); 11. "Warrior"	8	KOR: 12,419

=== Extended plays ===
Title	Details	Peak chart positions			Sales
Title	Details	KOR Gaon	TW	US World	Sales
R.eal1ze	Released: January 9, 2017; Label: Jellyfish Entertainment, CJ E&M; Format: CD, digital download; Track list: 1. Bomb (feat. San E); 2. Rose (feat. Ken of VIXX); 3. Ladi Dadi (feat. Microdot, Jero); 4. Home Alone (나홀로 집에) (feat. Jung Yong-hwa); 5. Do The Dance (아 몰라 일단); 6. Lean On Me; 7. Möbius Strip (뇌비우스의 띠) (feat. Esbee)	2	11	8	KOR: 23,547
R.ook Book	Released: March 5, 2019; Label: Jellyfish Entertainment; Format: CD, digital download; Track list: 1. R.ook Book; 2. Tuxedo; 3. L.A.Y.E.R.E.D (feat. SAAY); 4. See-Through (녹는점) (feat. Cold Bay); 5. Runway; 6. U-niverse (Cosmocorps) (feat. Rick Bridges); 7. Hoodie feat. Xydo, Raf Sandou); 8. Live (feat. Chungha) (Bonus track)	6	—	—	KOR: 18,048
Limitless	Released: November 8, 2019 (Part 1); Released: November 25, 2019 (Part 2); Label: Groovl1n, Genie Music, Stone Music Entertainment; Format: Digital download; Track list Part 1: 1. NZT (Prod. Yuth); 2. Limitless (feat. Sik-K, Xydo) (Prod. Yuth); 3. Venom (feat. Ja Mezz) (Prod. Dakshood); 4. Zombie; 5. Bada$$ (feat. Cold Bay) (Prod. Flash Note); 6. Brag (feat. Chillin Homie) (Prod. Flash Note); Part 2: 1. Q&A (feat. Zene The Zilla) (Prod. Yuth); 2. How Could You (feat. Raf Sandou) (Prod. Yuth); 3. Turn On The Light (feat. twlv) (Prod. Yuth); 4. Drug (feat. Kim Hyo-Eun) (Prod. Cool Cat); 5. Arousal (각성) (Prod. Yuth)	—	—	—	—N/a
Paradise	Released: July 28, 2020; Label: Groovl1n, Warner Music Korea; Format: Digital download; Track list: 1. U-Turn (유턴); 2. Paradise (feat. Ha Sung-woon); 3. Water Gun; 4. Question Mark; 5. If (feat. Big Naughty) (Prod. Woogie); 6. Rain Drop (비♡) (feat. Lee Na-eun of April)	—	—	—	—N/a
Roses	Released: June 3, 2021; Label: Groovl1n, Warner Music Korea; Format: Digital download; Track list: 1. Flower Garden (꽃밭); 2. Cardigan (feat. Wonstein); 3. Chee$e (feat. BLNK, Ahn Byeong Woong); 4. Red Velvet (feat. Jamie); 5. Roses; 6. Freezing Point (어는점) (feat. Xydo); 7. I Don't Deny	—	—	—	—N/a
Dessert Tape (with Xydo)	Released: June 30, 2022; Label: Groovl1n, Warner Music Korea; Format: Digital download; Track list: 1. Accent (말투) (feat. Leellamarz) (prod. Toil); 2. Your Dream (꿈속에); 3. I'm On Your Side (빈자리) (feat. Suen); 4. Calm (데리러 갈게); 5. Pick Up (잔잔하게)	—	—	—	—N/a
Love & Holiday	Released: September 12, 2022; Label: Groovl1n, Genie Music, Stone Music Entertainment; Format: CD, Digital download, streaming; Track list: 1. Don't Wake Me Up (내버려둬) (feat. Jayci Yucca); 2. Kiss You; 3. Dumb Dumb Dumb; 4. Love Hate Relationship (지독하게 엮여); 5. Do Not Disturb Mode (방해금지) (feat. Ourealgoat, 365lit, Blase); 6. Mirror (feat. Polodared); 7. Joe Goldberg; 8. Camera; 9. Bye (feat. Whee In); 10. Holiday	—	—	—	—N/a
"—" denotes releases that did not chart or were not released in that region.

=== Mixtapes ===
Title	Details	Peak chart positions
Title	Details	US World
R.ebirth	Released: March 12, 2016; Label: Jellyfish Entertainment, CJ E&M; Format: Streamed audio	—
R.ebirth	Re-released (R.ebirth 2016): January 5, 2018; Label: Jellyfish Entertainment, CJ E&M; Format: Digital download; Track list: 1. R.ebirth; 2. Move; 3. Lean On Me; 4. OX (feat. Basick); 5. Möbius Strip (뇌비우스의 띠) (feat. Esbee); 6. Control (Interlude); 7. Nod (끄덕끄덕) (feat. Donutman); 8. Good Women (착한 여자) (feat. Hanhae, Soulman); 9. Do The Dance (아 몰라 일단); 10. Where Should I Go (feat. Microdot); 11. Where Should I Go (Solo Ver.); 12. Who Are U (ft. Superbee); 13. Lucid Dream (feat. MICRODOT); 14. Hong Gil Dong	—
Nirvana	Released: January 22, 2018; Label: Jellyfish Entertainment, CJ E&M; Format: Digital download; Track list: 1. Boiling Point (끓는점) (feat. Sik. K); 2. Chameleon; 3. Nirvana (feat. Park Ji-min); 4. Ravi Da Loca; 5. Payday (feat. Choi Choa, OLNL); 6. Alcohol; 7. Where Am I (feat. Microdot)	5
K1tchen	Released: June 26, 2018; Label: Jellyfish Entertainment, CJ E&M; Format: Digital download; Track list: 1. Payback (feat. Coogie); 2. Sparring; 3. Frypan (feat. Double K, Microdot); 4. Pavlov's Dog (파블로프의 개) (feat. Cold Bay, Basick); 5. Scarynightt; 6. Shot (Bonus track)	—
Nirvana II	Released: August 29, 2019; Label: Groovl1n, Genie Music, Stone Music Entertainment; Format: Digital download; Track list: 1. Two Tone Drip (feat. Park Ji Woo, Make A Movie) (Prod. Cosmic Boy); 2. Leopard (feat. Solar of Mamamoo) (Prod. Cosmic Boy); 3. Still Nirvana (feat. Haon, Xydo) (Prod. Puff); 4. 0.I (Prod. GXXD); 5. Versa (Prod. Yuth); 6. Service (고객) (Prod. Yuth); 7. Unicorn (feat. Cold Bay) (Prod. GXXD)	—
"—" denotes releases that did not chart or were not released in that region.

=== Singles ===
Title	Year	Peak chart position	Sales	Album
Title	Year	KOR Gaon	Sales	Album
As lead artist
"DamnRa" (feat. SAM&SP3CK) (Note: "DamnRa" was a promotional tool for Jellyfish Entertainment's digital music platform Jelly Box.)	2016	—	—N/a	Non-album singles
"Who are U?" (feat. Superbee)	2016	—	—N/a	Non-album singles
"Home Alone" (나홀로 집에) (feat. Jung Yong-hwa)	2017	83	KOR (DL): 19,987+	R.eal1ze
"Bomb" (feat. San E)	2017	60	KOR (DL): 18,503+	R.eal1ze
"Adorable" (feat. Yang Yo-seob of Highlight)	2018	—	—N/a	Non-album single
"Live" (feat. Chungha)	2019	—	—N/a	R.ook Book
"Tuxedo"	2019	85	—N/a	R.ook Book
"See-Through" (녹는점) (feat. Cold Bay)	2019	—	—N/a	R.ook Book
"Vacay" (베케이)	2019	—	—N/a	Non-album singles
"Q&A" (feat. Zene the Zilla)	2019	—	—N/a	Limitless
"Brag" (feat. Chillin Homie)	2019	—	—N/a	Limitless
"Limitless" (feat. Sik-K, Xydo)	2019	—	—N/a	Limitless
"Drug" (feat. Keem Hyo-eun)	2019	—	—N/a	Limitless
"Limitless" (feat. Sik-K & Xydo)	2019	—	—N/a	Limitless
"Rockstar" (feat. Paloalto)	2020	—	—N/a	El Dorado
"Rain Drop" (비♡) (feat. Lee Na-eun of April)	2020	—	—N/a	Paradise
"Paradise" (feat. Ha Sung-woon)	2020	—	—N/a	Paradise
"Gray Zone" (feat. Chillin Homie)	2020	—	—N/a	Good Girl (Episode 2)
"Leaf" (낙엽) (feat. 10cm)	2020	—	—N/a	Non-album singles
"Pause"	2020	—	—N/a	Non-album singles
"Bum" (범) (feat. Chillin Homie & Kid Milli)	2021	—	—N/a	Non-album singles
"Cardigan" (feat. Wonstein)	2021	—	—N/a	Roses
"Flower Garden" (꽃밭)	2021	—	—N/a	Roses
"Ani" (애니) (feat. Jeon So-yeon of (G)I-dle)	2021	—	—N/a	Love&Fight
"Winner" (feat. Ash Island)	2022	—	—N/a	Love&Fight
"Block Party"	2022	—	—N/a	Non-album single
"Bye" (feat. Whee In)	2022	—	—N/a	Non-album single
"Who We Are" (안녕)	2022	—	—N/a	Non-album single
"Revoir"	2022	—	—N/a	Non-album single
"Dust"	2026	—	—N/a	Non-album single
Collaborations
"Blossom" (feat. Eunha of GFriend)	2019	67	—	Non-album single
"Fashionable" (with Cold Bay, Xydo)	2019	—	—	Non-album single
"Asura" (with Chillin Homie, Xydo, Cold Bay)	2019	—	—	Non-album single
"BANDI & LUNI'S" (with Cold Bay, Xydo)	2019	—	—	Non-album single
"What About You" (묻지마) (with Ailee)	2020	—	—	Non-album single
"Summer Memories" (with Kim Namjoo, Kang Seung-sik)	2020	—	—	Non-album single
As featured artist
"Rock the World" (Chad Future feat. Ravi)	2014	—	—N/a	The First Mini Album
"Diamond Love" (Rain feat. Ravi)	2015	—	—N/a	Diamond Lover OST
"When It Rains" (비가 내리면) (Melody Day feat. Ravi)	2015	41	KOR: 40,112+	Color
"Feeling Abandoned" (Kiggen feat. Eluphant, Ravi, ESBEE)	2016	—	—N/a	The Original
"Use Me" (Kim Wan-sun feat. Ravi)	2016	—	—N/a	Non-album single
"Wave" (Microdot feat. Ravi, Lil Boi)	2016	—	—N/a	+64
"B-Day" (예전같지 않아) (ESBEE feat. Ravi)	2017	—	—N/a	Non-album single
"Blah Blah" (Microdot feat. Ravi)	2017	—	—N/a	Prophet
"TML" (Cold Bay feat. Ravi)	2019	—	—N/a	Chasing
"Goin' Crazy" (Park Kyung feat. Ravi)	2019	—	—N/a	Melody Bookstore, Pt. 4
"Humming" (Gree feat. Ravi)	2020	—	—N/a	Non-digital single
"Mint Chocolate" (Xydo feat. Ravi)	2020	—	—N/a	Non-digital single
"Twerking" (TWLV feat. Ravi)	2020	—	—N/a	Non-digital single
"I'm Unfamiliar" (은근히 낯가려요) (Moon Se-yoon feat. Ravi)	2021	135	—N/a	Debut Project
"If I were rich" (내가 부자라면) (South Club feat. Ravi)	2021	—	—N/a	If I were rich
"ParaPara Queen" (Son Minsu feat. Ravi)	2021	—	—N/a	Non-album single
"My Love" (Seo In-guk feat. Ravi)	2022	70	—N/a	Love&Love
"Girlfriend" (Suen feat. Ravi)	2026	—	—N/a	Non-album single
"—" denotes releases that did not chart or were not released in that region.

== Concerts & live performances ==
Year	Title	City	Country	Location	Notes	Ref.
2016	TWO FOR THE SHOW 2 : Ravi's 1st Live Party [R.EBIRTH]	Seoul	South Korea	Hyundai Card Understage		
2017	RAVI 1st REAL-LIVE [R.EAL1ZE]	Seoul	South Korea	MUV Hall		
2018	RAVI 2nd REAL-LIVE [NIRVANA]	Seoul	South Korea	Yes24 Live Hall		
2018	First Solo Europe Tour 2018	Istanbul	Turkey	Uniq Hall		
2018	First Solo Europe Tour 2018	Madrid	Spain	Gotham The Club		
2018	First Solo Europe Tour 2018	Vienna	Austria	City Club		
2018	First Solo Europe Tour 2018	Amsterdam	Netherlands	Panama Club		
2018	First Solo Europe Tour 2018	Brussels	Belgium	Bazaar Club		
2018	First Solo Europe Tour 2018	Cologne	Germany	E-Feld		
2018	First Solo Europe Tour 2018	Bucharest	Romania	Beluga Music		
2018	First Solo Europe Tour 2018	Warsaw	Poland	Voodoo Club		
2018	First Solo Europe Tour 2018	London	United Kingdom	Fire Vauxhall		
2018	First Solo Europe Tour 2018	Paris	France	O'Sullivans Backstage By The Mill		
2019	RAVI 3rd REAL-LIVE [R.OOK BOOK]	Seoul	South Korea	Yes24 Live Hall		
2019	RAVI 3rd REAL-LIVE [R.OOK BOOK]	Taipei	Taiwan	Clapper Studio		
2019	RAVI 3rd REAL-LIVE [R.OOK BOOK]	Tokyo	Japan	Shinjuku ReNY		
2019	RAVI 3rd REAL-LIVE [R.OOK BOOK]	New Jersey	United States	White Eagle Hall		
2019	RAVI 3rd REAL-LIVE [R.OOK BOOK]	Atlanta	United States	The Loft at Center Stage		
2019	RAVI 3rd REAL-LIVE [R.OOK BOOK]	Dallas	United States	Cambridge Room at House of Blues		
2019	RAVI 3rd REAL-LIVE [R.OOK BOOK]	Los Angeles	United States	Belasco Ballroom		
2020	ONCAST Live RAVI 2020 [EL DORADO]	Live online streaming				
2021	RAVI’s ROOM	Live online streaming				
2022	2022 RAVI CONCERT [REVOIR]	Seoul	South Korea	Yes24 Live Hall		
2022	2022 GROOVL1N U.S. TOUR	Los Angeles	United States	Teragram Ballroom	With labelmate Xydo	
2022	2022 GROOVL1N U.S. TOUR	Denver	United States	The Oriental Theater	With labelmate Xydo	
2022	2022 GROOVL1N U.S. TOUR	Dallas	United States	South Side Music Hall	With labelmate Xydo	
2022	2022 GROOVL1N U.S. TOUR	Atlanta	United States	Buckhead Theatre	With labelmate Xydo	
2022	2022 GROOVL1N U.S. TOUR	Chicago	United States	Copernicus Center	With labelmate Xydo	
2022	2022 GROOVL1N U.S. TOUR	New York City	United States	Le Poisson Rouge (LPR)	With labelmate Xydo	
2022	Ravi Holiday Party	Seoul	South Korea	Musinsa Garage		

=== Festival solo stage performances ===
Year	Title	City	Country	Location	Ref.
2016	2016 Rapbeat Show & Nite	Seoul	South Korea	Lotte Hotel Seoul (Crystal Ballroom)	
2017	Rapbeat Show 2017	Sydney	Australia	The Dome at Sydney Olympic Park	
2017	NBA Buzzer Beat Festival 2017	Seoul	South Korea	KBS Arena	
2018	Rapbeat Show 2018	Seoul	South Korea	Gocheok Sky Dome	
2019	Seoul Jazz Festival 2019	Seoul	South Korea	Olympic Park	
2019	Waterbomb Gwangju 2019	Gwangju	South Korea	Gwangju Women's University Universiade Gymnasium	
2021	The Live Music Festival: Someday PLEROMA 2021	Seoul	South Korea	Jangchung Arena	
2022	Waterbomb Busan 2022	Busan	South Korea	Busan Asiad Main Stadium	

== Filmography ==
=== Television series ===
Year	Title	Role	Notes	Ref.
2014	The Heirs	Himself	Cameo (episode 4)	

=== Television shows ===
Year	Title	Role	Notes	Ref.
2015	Show Me the Money 4	Contestant	Eliminated in the second round	
2018	Real Man 300	Cast member		
2018	King of Mask Singer	Contestant	as "Burst" Episode 175	
2019	Mirage Restaurant	Host		
2019–2022	2 Days & 1 Night	Cast member	Season 4 (Episode 1–123)	
2020	Don't Be Jealous	Host	Episode 2 onwards	

=== Web shows ===
Year	Title	Role	Notes	Ref.
2020	Question Mark	Host		
2021	Idol Dictation Contest	Cast Member	Season 1–2	

=== Voice work ===
==== Audiobook narration ====
Year	Title	Author	Publisher	Notes	Ref.
2019	The Strange Tale of Ssireum at Cheonggiwa Gas Station (청기와주유소 씨름 기담)	Chung Serang	Everline	as a part of EBS project “Idols Read, Connecting Hearts” (아이돌이 읽다, 마음을 잇다)	

==== Narration ====
Year	Title	Notes	Ref.
2016	Gugudan Project - Extreme School Trip	Episode 2 narrator	

== Awards and nominations ==
Name of the award ceremony, year presented, category, nominee of the award, and the result of the nomination
Award ceremony	Year	Category	Nominee / Work	Result	Ref.
Brand of the Year Awards	2020	Variety Star Idol of the Year	2 Days & 1 Night	Won	
KBS Entertainment Awards	2021	Rookie Award in Show/Variety Category	2 Days & 1 Night	Won	
K-Model Awards with AMF GLOBAL	2021	Singer category	Ravi	Won	
