= Lee Do-yeop =

South Korean actor (born 1972)

- 이도엽
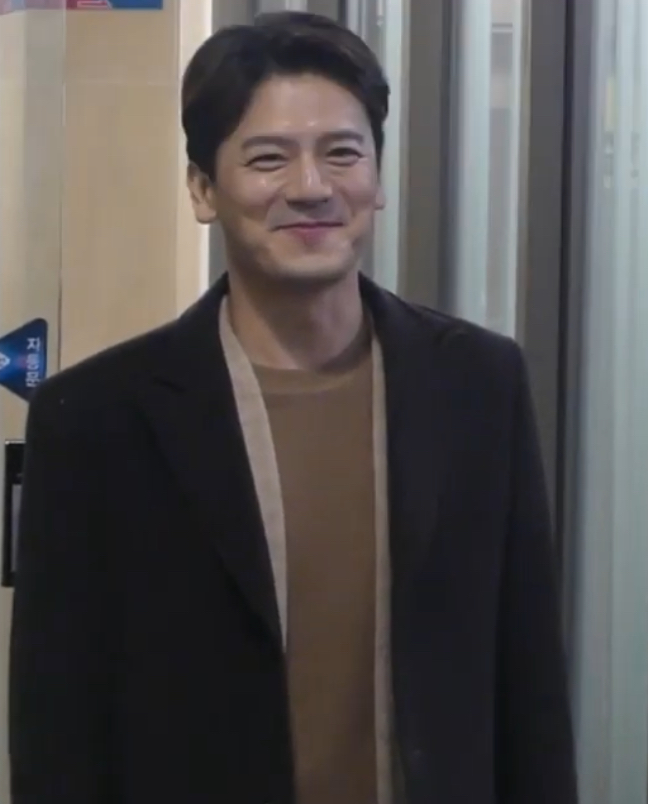
- Lee in 2019
- Born: April 11, 1972 (age 54); Daegu, South Korea
- Other names: Lee Do-yup, Lee Do-yub
- Education: Sejong University Graduate School of Performing Arts; Master's Degree in Acting Arts; Sejong University Graduate School of Performing Arts PhD
- Occupations: Actor; theatre director
- Years active: 1997–present
- Agent: FN Entertainment
- Spouse: Jeon Su-ah (m. 2008)
- Children: 1

Korean name
- Hangul: 이도엽
- RR: I Doyeop
- MR: I Toyŏp

Lee Do-yeop (Korean: 이도엽; born on April 11, 1972) is a South Korean theater actor and director. As an actor he also does various supporting roles in television and film. He's known as scene stealer in dramas such as The Uncanny Counter, Run On, and Hometown Cha-Cha-Cha.

== Career ==
Lee Do-yeop revealed that his was interested to become actor after watching Charlie Chaplin and Tom Hanks. He took the bold step of moved to Seoul in pursuit of his dream. After facing initial challenges, he managed to secure a position with a film company and began his acting career with a movie directed by Park Chan-wook titled Trio.

Lee came to the realization that he couldn't neglect his education while pursuing his acting career. Therefore, at the age of 27, he made the decision to enroll in school and discovered a newfound enjoyment in the process of learning. Over time, he successfully obtained a bachelor's, master's, and even a doctoral degree. Throughout his academic journey, those around him suggested that he consider a career as a professor. Although he didn't actively pursue this path, he couldn't help but wonder if their encouragement had influenced his thoughts.

Concurrently, he actively participated in various stage plays, which served as a solid groundwork for honing his acting abilities. Lee then renowned both as an actor and director in the theater industry. In 2007, he directed "The Guy Meets Her," a contemporary adaptation of Anton Chekhov's one-act comedy. Additionally, he helmed "The Proposal" in 2011, another modern interpretation of Chekhov's work.

As he immersed himself in the world of theater, he also began watching dramas and felt a desire to explore this medium. It was during this period that the idea of trying his hand at acting in dramas first crossed his mind.

Lee gained recognition for his involvement in a family commercial that received the Korean Advertising Award in 2009. This thoughtfully crafted advertisement adopts a documentary-style approach, capturing the journey of bringing new life into the world and showcasing the growth of a mother and her baby.

On February 26, 2020, Lee signed an exclusive contract with FN Entertainment.

== Personal life ==
In January 2008, Lee married Jeon Su-ah, a fellow theater actress and his junior at Sejong University. Their relationship started while performing together in the play A Beauty Salon for 10 Pyeong, and after just six months, they decided to tie the knot.

In December 2008, Woongjin Coway, a company, held auditions for couples expecting a baby. Over 200 couples applied, but only three, including Lee and Jeon, were chosen for a commercial shoot. On December 27, 2008, Jeon gave birth to their son naturally. The commercial showing the birth of their son, Lee Si-hoo, became very popular. People loved the baby so much that he even earned the nickname "Nation's Baby".

== Filmography ==
=== Film ===
Film appearances
| Year | Title | | Role | Notes |
| Year | English | Original | Role | Notes |
|---|---|---|---|---|
| 1997 | Trio | 3인조 | Cellphone Man | Minor role |
| 1998 | Art Museum by the Zoo | 미술관 옆 동물원 | Secretary Lee | Minor role |
| 2000 | Joint Security Area | 공동경비구역 JSA | Namhangun 7 station | Minor role |
| 2002 | 2009: Lost Memories | 2009 로스트 메모리즈 | Ajit Ainsenjin | Minor role |
| 2006 | Vampire Cop Ricky | 흡혈형사 나도열 | Detective | Minor role |
| 2007 | Maggie, oh my love maggie, 2007 | 매기, 내 사랑하는 매기야 | Lee | Main Role |
| 2013 | The Face Reader | 관상 | Kim Seung-gyu | |
| 2013 | Killer Toon | 더 웹툰: 예고살인 | Autopsy Doctor | |
| 2017 | A Day | 하루 | Paramedic Team Leader | |
| 2017 | The Artist: Reborn | 아티스트: 다시 태어나다 | Seoul City Official | |
| 2018 | Don't Go Too Far | 멀리가지마라 | Chief Detective | |
| 2019 | Inseparable Bros | 나의 특별한 형제 | Lawyer Oh | |
| 2020 | Pawn | 담보 | Counselor | |
| 2020 | Beyond That Mountain | 저 산 너머 | Master of ceremonies | Special appearance |
| 2020 | Honest Candidate | 정직한 후보 | Debate Moderator | |
| 2022 | Hero | 영웅 | Departure soldier | |

=== Television ===
List of Television Works
| Year | Title | | Role | Notes/Ref. |
| Year | English | Korean | Role | Notes/Ref. |
|---|---|---|---|---|
| 2008 | The Return of Iljimae | 일지매 | | |
| 2008 | Love Does Not Stop | 사랑은 쉬지 않는다 | Old Lover | |
| 2010 | Smile, Mom | 웃어요, 엄마 | Yoon Min-ju's ex-husband | |
| 2010 | Starry Sword Season 2 | 별순검 시즌 2 | | |
| 2010 | All About Marriage | 결혼해주세요 | Dong-hyuk | |
| 2010 | Golden Fish | 황금물고기 | | |
| 2011 | It's Okay, Daddy's Girl | 괜찮아, 아빠딸 | | |
| 2012 | The Great Seer | 대풍수 | Lee Kang-dal | |
| 2015 | Oh My Ghost | 오 나의 귀신님 | Pension owner | |
| 2015 | Six Flying Dragons | 육룡이 나르샤 | Goryeo King Gong yang | |
| 2016 | Listen to Love | 이번 주 아내가 바람을 핍니다 | Hyun Chan | |
| 2016 | Don't Dare to Dream | 질투의 화신 | Homeroom teacher | |
| 2016 | Signal | 시그널 | Kim Jung-jae | |
| 2017 | Prison Playbook | 슬기로운 감빵생활 | Director Do | |
| 2017 | Live Up to Your Name | 명불허전 | Oh Ha-ra's father | |
| 2017 | Suspicious Partner | 수상한 파트너 | Eun Man-su | |
| 2017 | Man to Man | 맨투맨 | PD Choi | |
| 2017 | Korea History | 한국사기 | | |
| 2018 | Witch's Love | 마녀의 사랑 | | |
| 2019 | Love with Flaws | 하자있는 인간들 | Joo Seo-yeon's father | |
| 2019 | Rookie Historian Goo Hae-ryung | 신입사관 구해령 | Shim Geum-yeol | |
| 2019 | Melting Me Softly | 날 녹여주오 | Adult Baek Young-tak | |
| 2019 | Designated Survivor: 60 Days | 60일, 지정생존자 | Ahn Se-young | |
| 2019 | Haechi | 해치 | Jo Hyeon -myeong | |
| 2020 | Run On | 런 온 | Athletic Committee | |
| 2020 | The Uncanny Counter | 경이로운 소문 | Jo Tae-shin | Season 1 |
| 2021 | Armored Saurus | 아머드사우루스 | Commander Choi Cheol | |
| 2021 | Now, We Are Breaking Up | 지금, 헤어지는 중입니다 | Choi Kyung-chan | |
| 2021 | Hometown Cha-Cha-Cha | 갯마을 차차차 | Kim Woo-seok (Gamri's son) | |
| 2022 | KBS Drama Special – Silence of the Lambs | 드라마 스페셜 – 양들의 침묵 | Lieutenant Colonel Jang Dong-hyun | one-act drama |
| 2022 | Little Women | 작은 아씨들 | Won Ki-seon | |
| 2022 | Adamas | 아다마스 | mysterious man | |
| 2022–2023 | The First Responders | 소방서 옆 경찰서 | Matthew Hwa | Season 1–2 |
| 2024 | Flex X Cop | 재벌X형사 | Park Chan-gun | |

== Stage ==
=== As theater actor ===
| Year | Title | | Role | Theater |
| Year | English | Korean | Role | Theater |
|---|---|---|---|---|
| 2023.06.20–2023.08.05 | Army on the Tree | 나무 위의 군대 | Master Sergeant | LG Art Center Seoul U+ Stage |
| 2020.12.03–2021.02.14 | Grandpa Henri and I | 앙리할아버지와 나 | Paul | Yes 24 Stage 1 |
| 2020.11.13–2020.11.14 | Grandpa Henri and I | 앙리할아버지와 나 | Paul | Sejong Traditional Theater |
| 2020.11.06–2020.11.07 | Grandpa Henri and I | 앙리할아버지와 나 | Paul | Hanam Culture and Arts Center Small Theater (Arang Hall) |
| 2020.04.07–2020.06.21 | Deathtrap | 데스트랩 | Sydney Brune | Daehak-ro T.O.M. Hall 1 |
| 2019.04.19–2019.04.20 | Truth X Lies – Incheon | 진실X거짓 – 인천 | Michelle | Bupyeong Art Center Dalnuri Theater |
| 2019.03.22–2019.03.24 | Truth X Lies – Incheon | 진실X거짓 – 인천 | Michelle | Daejeon Arts Center Ensemble Hall |
| 2019.02.22–2019.02.24 | Truth X Lies – Incheon | 진실X거짓 – 인천 | Michelle | Seongnam Art Center Ensemble Theater |
| 2018.11.06–2019.01.27 | Theatrical Battle 7 – Truth X Lies | 연극열전7 – 진실X거짓 | Michelle | Art One Theater Hall 2 |
| 2018.06.01–2018.06.02 | Grandpa Henri and I – Suwon | 앙리할아버지와 나 – 수원 | Paul | Suwon SK Atrium Grand Performance Hall |
| 2018.05.26–2018.05.27 | Grandpa Henri and I – Suwon | 앙리할아버지와 나 – 수원 | Paul | Centum City Sohyang Theater Shinhan Card Hall |
| 2018.05.04–2018.05.05 | Grandpa Henri and I – Suwon | 앙리할아버지와 나 – 수원 | Paul | Daejeon Arts Center Ensemble Hall |
| 2018.04.20–2018.04.21 | Grandpa Henri and I – Suwon | 앙리할아버지와 나 – 수원 | Paul | Ulsan Culture and Arts Center Small Performance Hall |
| 2018.03.30–2018.03.31 | A day of culture with KHNP – Gyeongju | 한수원과 함께하는 문화가 있는 날 – 경주 | Paul | Gyeongju Arts Center Grand Performance Hall (Hwarang Hall) |
| 2018.01.30–2018.04.15 | Never The Thinner | 네버 더 시너 | Darrow | Yes 24 Stage 2 |
| 2017.12.15–2018.02.18 | Grandpa Henri and I | 앙리할아버지와 나 | Paul | Yes 24 Stage 1 |
| 2017.07.25–2017.08.27 | Venus in Fur | 비너스 인 퍼 | Thomas | Doosan Art Center Space111 |
| 2016.09.29–2016.10.02 | Seagull – Seongnam | 갈매기 – 성남 | Dorn | Seongnam Art Center Ensemble Theater |
| 2016.04.22–2016.05.15 | Purgatory | 연옥 | man | Yegreen Theater |
| 2015.12.05–2015.12.27 | All Day Song | 종일본가 | father | Daehakro Installation Theater Jeongmiso |
| 2015.02.07–2015.02.08 | Golden Pond – Ulsan | 황금연못 – 울산 | Bill Ray | Ulsan Culture and Arts Center Grand Hall |
| 2015.01.17–2015.01.18 | Golden Pond – Ulsan | 황금연못 – 울산 | Bill Ray | Daegu Culture and Arts Center Palgong Hall (Grand Theater) |
| 2014.12.27–2014.12.28 | Golden Pond – Ulsan | 황금연못 – 울산 | Bill Ray | Jeju Art Center |
| 2014.09.19–2014.11.23 | Golden Pond – Ulsan | 황금연못 – 울산 | Bill Ray | Yes 24 Stage 1 |
| 2014.06.19–2014.07.20 | Autumn Fireflies | 가을 반딧불이 | Satoshi | Seoul Arts Center Jayu Small Theater |
| 2014.02.07–2014.03.02 | Autumn Fireflies | 가을 반딧불이 | Satoshi | Daehakro Arts Theater Grand Theater |
| 2013.06.14–2013.06.30 | Autumn Fireflies | 가을 반딧불이 | Satoshi | Daehakro Arts Theater Grand Theater |
| 2012.08.17–2012.09.02 | The Inventor Next Door | 이웃집 발명가 | unknown | Hanyang Repertory Theater |
| 2011.12.29–2012.01.08 | Flower Bonus | 꽃상여 | unknown | Daehakro Arts Theater Grand Theater |
| 2011.06.17–2011.06.29 | Stupid Whitepaper | 백치 백지 | story teller | Daehakro Arts Theater Grand Theater |
| 2009.12.13–2009.12.27 | Two Medeas | 두 메데아 | Jason | Hakjeon Blue Small Theater |
| 2009.05.18–2009.05.23 | 2009 Seoul Theater Festival – Family on the road | 2009 서울연극제 – 길 떠나는 가족 | Joong-seop's friend | Arko Arts Theater Grand Theater |
| 2007.03.15–2007.03.25 | Seagull | 갈매기 | Medvezenko railway | LG Art Center |

=== As theater director ===
List of Directing Work(s)
| Year | Title | | Role | Ref. |
| Year | English | Korean | Role | Ref. |
|---|---|---|---|---|
| 2011 | The Proposal | 청혼 | Modern take on Anton Chekhov work A Marriage Proposal. | |
| 2007 | The Guy Meets Her | 그놈, 그녀를 만나다 | A work made by combining two Anton Chekhov's farce called The Bear and A Marriage Proposal. | |

== Awards ==
List of award(s)
| Award ceremony | Year | Category | Recipient | Result | Ref. |
|---|---|---|---|---|---|
| The Korea Advertising Awards | 2019 | Best CF Model | Lee Do-yeop with Jeon Su-ah, and Lee Si-hoo; Pfor Woongjin Coway's CF | Won | |
| 2007 Seoul Theater Festival | 2007 | Best Actor Award | Seagull | Won | |
