= Moorim School: Saga of the Brave =

2016 South Korean television series

- Promotional poster
- Genre: Fantasy; Action; Romance; Drama
- Written by: Kim Hyun-hee; Yang Jin-ah
- Directed by: Lee So-yon
- Starring: Lee Hyun-woo; Lee Hong-bin; Seo Yea-ji; Jung Yoo-jin
- Original languages: Korean, Mandarin, English and Thai
- No. of episodes: 16

Production
- Executive producer: Kim Hyung-il
- Producers: Yun Jae-hyuk; Kang Min-kyung
- Running time: 65 minutes
- Production company: JS Pictures

Original release
- Network: KBS2
- Release: January 11 – March 8, 2016

Moorim School: Saga of the Brave (Korean: 무림학교; RR: Murimhakgyo; lit. 'Moorim School') is a 2016 South Korean television series starring Lee Hyun-woo, Lee Hong-bin, Seo Yea-ji and Jung Yoo-jin. It aired from January 11 to March 8, 2016, on KBS2 every Monday and Tuesday at 21:55 KST. The drama is set around the mysterious Moorim Institute which teaches its students virtues including honesty, faith, sacrifice and communication. The teachers and students at the school come from different countries and each have their own stories.

== Synopsis ==
Yoon Shi-Woo (Lee Hyun-woo) is the leader of the South Korean idol group Mobius. He also happens to be an orphan with hardly any recollection of his past or true identity. His rise in popularity and fame made him become arrogant and prickly in nature, but he has a serious problem: he is suffering from painful hearing loss that doctors have not been able to determine the real cause of his hearing loss and the doctors were unable to find the cure. The only possible hope comes from a female fan named Hwang Sun-ah (Jung Yoo-jin) who told him to go to Moorim Institute and have Dean Hwang, her father, heal him. Considering him more trouble than he is worth, Shi-woo's CEO tries to get rid of him by framing him in a scandal with a female rookie idol. As the public starts to hate him, he decides to come to Moorim Institute in the end in hopes that he would be cured.

Wang Chi-Ang (Lee Hong-bin) is the son of Wang Hao, the president of China's largest enterprise groups in Shanghai. Spoiled and selfish, he acts like he owns the world, yet hides his own wounds: he is an illegitimate son who was born from a Korean mother. Chi-ang's father also wants him to go to Moorim Institute, but Chi-ang refuses to go until he meets Shim Soon-deok (Seo Yea-ji), a sweet, confident young woman who works hard at several jobs to care for her blind father. Completely enchanted by her, he agrees to his father's wishes when he discovers that she secretly attends Moorim Institute without letting her father know.

The boys are forced to share a room together and they instantly dislike each other, with them engaging in several heated disputes all the time. With time, however, their relationship does improve as they gradually get closer and learn more about each other.

Moorim Institute isn't focused solely on high academic scores. The school teaches its students virtues including honesty, faith, sacrifice and communication. The teachers and students come from different countries and each have their own stories to tell. The school is located in a segregated part in the forest and is protected by a special seal to prevent outsiders from trespassing or breaking in, until this seal is unexpectedly broken when Chi-ang and Shi-woo were attempting to find their way to the school.

Everyone has a secret to hide, and after certain anomalous happenings in the school it caused the students to believe that the school has its own mysteries and they are convinced it involves Dean Hwang, who is an enigma to begin with. And all of these peculiar incidents that possess great danger to the safety of the students are somehow related to the Chintamani, which, when in possession, the person attains a puissant and formidable power that allows him to control the world.

As the boys (Chi-ang and Shi-woo) grow in character and strength, they discover that there is more to both of them than appearances suggest: especially Shi-woo, whose hearing loss seems to hide strange and unique powers and after several strange occurrences in the school he is led to believe that his past is the cause. With this, he aims to find out what his true identity is, and how his past as a child could have affected his present predicaments.

Amidst all this an inevitable rivalry develops between both Chi-ang and Shi-woo as both, being competitive, constantly strive to improve and be the best. This, too, involves the pursuing of Soon-deok, with whom both parties are in love with.

== Cast ==
=== Main ===
- Lee Hyun-woo as Chae Joon / Yoon Shi-woo (South Korea)
- Lee Hong-bin as Wang Chi-ang (China)
- Seo Yea-ji as Shim Soon-duk (South Korea)
- Jung Yoo-jin as Chae Young / Hwang Sun-ah (South Korea)

=== Students ===
- Alexander Lee as Yeob Jung (China)

Yeob Jung is as mysterious as he is self-righteous, thinking that he is better than everyone else but also doesn't want anyone to give Moorim Institute a bad name, he is focused more on his studies rather than being friends with anyone at the school. His behavior is later revealed to stem from his insecurities with his family, especially with his older brother.

- Han Geun-sub as Choi Ho (South Korea)

Choi Ho is a low ranking student who wishes to become number one and would do anything to become number one, even if it means unethically correcting them himself.

- Park Shin-woo as Ko Sang-man (South Korea)
- Supasit Chinvinijkul (Pop) as Nadet (Thailand)

With an IQ of 160, Nadet is the scientific genius out of the students at Moorim Institute and has an interest in state-of-the-art technology, including drones which he uses to spy on the happenings around the school.

- Ji Hye-ran as Jenny Oh (South Korea)
- Shannon as Shannon (United Kingdom)
- Han Do-woo as Dong Goo (South Korea)

Dong Goo is one of the youngest of the boys at the school and is also skilled in Kendo.

=== Faculty ===
- Shin Hyun-joon as Hwang Moo-song (South Korea)

The Secretary and Dean of Moorim Institute. In the first episode of Moorim School, he showed his ability to summon fog to hide him away from the chasers. It's also hinted that he can perform certain kind of magic to create a seal to disguise Moorim Institute, making it impossible for any outsider to trespass into Moorim, until Shi-woo and Chi-ang unknowingly break the seal for the first time in the school's history.

- Jang Gwang as Bub Gong (South Korea)

Moorim Institute's Zen teacher.

- Jung Hee-tae as Kim Dae-ho (South Korea)

Moorim Institute's cooking teacher and health classes.

- Kan Mi-youn as Yoo-di (South Korea)

Moorim Institute's sports and dance teacher.

- Daniel Lindemann as Daniel (Germany)

Moorim Institute's teacher responsible for supervising courtesy, organizing discussion and teaching Hapkido.

- Sam Okyere as Sam (Ghana)

Moorim Institute's security officer and dorm manager.

=== Juk Poong Party ===
- Shin Sung-woo as Chae Yoon (South Korea)

He is Hwang Seon Ah and Yoon Shi Woo's biological father, and was/is Hwang Moo Sung's best friend, but Chae Yoon had a misunderstanding about Hwang Moo Sung in the past by Juk Poong's defamed information of Hwang Moo Sung. He is a martial arts master and is the only person who is able to master a power called, "Gi Chae Sool", it's a power used to protect oneself and others that he cares about. Another person who took after him is his biological son, Chae Joon a.k.a. Yoon Shi Woo, who was born with the same power from his father. He was in coma for over 18 years with a foggy memory of his past.

- Sarinpat Limpornkrittiwong (Nannan) as Luna (Thailand)
- Jeong Won-jung as Park Tae-sung / Juk Poong (South Korea)

A senior member of the International Moorim Association. He warned Chae Yoon about trusting his friend Hwang Moo Sung, which led to the events 18 years prior. Later revealed to be the leader of Juk Poong who wanted nothing but the Cintamani's power.

=== Extended cast ===
- Lee Moon-sik as Shim Bong-san (South Korea)

The sole parent and father of Shim Soon-duk. After losing his eyesight in an accident eighteen years ago, Shim Bong-san moved to the countryside to live quietly. For some reason, he keeps warning Soon-duk not to go near Moorim Institute, and tries to avoid any possible reason that might cause Soon-duk to go to Moorim Institute, such as helping Chi-ang's mother delivering foods to him.

- Hong Ji-min as Ko Bang-duk (South Korea)

She acts as Soon-duk's step-mother, deeply caring for both Soon-duk and her father. Housekeeper of Wang Chi-ang's mother.

- Hwang In-young as Kang Baek-ji (South Korea)

The Korean mother of Wang Chi-ang and Wang Hao's girlfriend.

- Lee Beom-soo as Wang Hao (China)

The President of the Shanghai Group; China's largest enterprise groups in Shanghai, and Wang Chi-ang's father. He has some deep connections with Moorim Institute; 3 years prior, Wang Hao met with a bedridden Park Tae Sung who knows he is Juk Poong as well as their quest for the Cintamani. Revealing that he wants the Chintamani as well, he struck a bargain: Wang Hao will aid Juk Poong's quest for the key to the Chintamani (even hospitalizing Chae Yoon in one of their affiliate hospitals), Shanghai Group invested in Moorim Institute as its benefactor, as well as sending Chi-ang to Moorim under the pretext of finally letting Kang Baek-ji live in China as his wife.

- Kim Dong-wan (cameo) as Kang Tae-oh (South Korea)

An alumnus of Moorim Institute: the top 1 student and intended successor of the International Moorim Association, but backed out at the last minute. Currently living as a taekwondo master teaching young students, when he was invited by the Moorim Institute for its annual competition.

== Original soundtrack ==
Moorim School: Saga of the Brave OST

Soundtrack album by Various Artists
- Released: January 18, 2016 - Part. 1 February 1, 2016 - Part. 2 February 15, 2016 - Part. 3 February 22, 2016 - Part. 4 April 27, 2016 - Moorim School OST
- Genres: Drama, Dance-pop, Ballad
- Labels: CJ E&M, JS Pictures

The Moorim School: Saga of the Brave soundtrack was released in four parts plus a complete instrumental soundtrack. It features the main theme songs "Alive" and "The King" by VIXX, it also includes "One Thing" by Lee Hyun-woo and "When I See You" (Korean: 그댈 보면) by Ken.

OST Part 1
No.	Title	Artist	Length
1.	"Alive"	VIXX	5:08
2.	"나답지 않게" ("Unlike Me")	지헤라 (Z.Hera) & 려진 (Ryujin)	3:42
3.	"Fighting"	원택 (1 Take)	3:18
4.	"RUN"	하성 (Haseong)	3:18

OST Part 2
No.	Title	Artist	Length
1.	"Hey Girl"	비아이지 (B.I.G)	3:28
2.	"중독" ("Addicted")	테이크 (Take)	3:40
3.	"Fire"	Hani	3:47
4.	"The King"	VIXX	3:29

OST Part 3
No.	Title	Artist	Length
1.	"One Thing"	Lee Hyun-woo	3:50

OST Part 4
No.	Title	Artist	Length
1.	"그댈 보면" ("When I See You") (Male Ver.)	Ken (VIXX)	4:00
2.	"그댈 보면" ("When I See You") (Female Ver.)	천가연 (Cheon Ga Yeon)	4:00

Moorim School: Saga of the Brave OST
No.	Title	Artist	Length
1.	"Be Crazy" (Feat. 백인)	Mine
2.	"The Warrior"	Choi Inhui
3.	"Oathkeeper"	Oh Yeju
4.	"Welcome to Moorim"	Choi Inhui
5.	"Beyond Success"	Choi Inhui
6.	"School Zone"	Park Areum
7.	"In This Moment"	Choi Inhui
8.	"Light Steps"	Jang Gyeongjin
9.	"When I Saw You"	Choi Inhui
10.	"Lost Memory"	Oh Yeju
11.	"Alive"	VIXX	5:08

== Ratings ==
- In this table, the blue numbers represent the lowest ratings and the red numbers represent the highest ratings.
- N/A denotes that the rating is not known.

Ep.	Original broadcast date	Average audience share		
Ep.	Original broadcast date	TNmS	AGB Nielsen	
Ep.	Original broadcast date	Nationwide	Nationwide	Seoul
1	January 11, 2016	5.4%	5.1%	4.8%
2	January 12, 2016	5.2%	4.0%	3.8%
3	January 18, 2016	4.9%	3.7%	3.5%
4	January 19, 2016	5.1%	4.4%	4.2%
5	January 25, 2016	4.7%	3.5%	3.3%
6	January 26, 2016	4.4%	3.8%	3.6%
7	February 1, 2016	4.0%	3.5%	3.3%
8	February 2, 2016	3.9%	3.3%	3.0%
9	February 15, 2016	3.2%	3.4%	3.1%
10	February 16, 2016	3.8%	3.4%	3.2%
11	February 22, 2016	3.7%	2.6%	2.5%
12	February 23, 2016	3.9%	3.2%	3.0%
13	February 29, 2016	3.4%	3.2%	2.9%
14	March 1, 2016	3.4%	2.8%	2.6%
15	March 7, 2016	3.4%	2.8%	—N/a
16	March 8, 2016	4.3%	3.7%	—N/a
Average		4.1%	3.5%	— (Note: Due to some ratings not recorded, the exact average rating is unknown.)

- Initially slated for twenty episodes, the series was cut down in its third week to sixteen because of poor ratings.

== International broadcast ==
- In Singapore, the drama was available to stream on Viu with English and Chinese subtitles. Each episode was available eight hours after the original Korean broadcast.
- The series aired one week after first broadcast on KBS World with English subtitles.
