= While You Were Sleeping (2017 TV series) =

2017 South Korean TV series

- Promotional poster
- Genre: Romance; Fantasy; Thriller; Comedy; Legal drama
- Written by: Park Hye-ryun
- Directed by: Oh Chung-hwan
- Starring: Lee Jong-suk; Bae Suzy; Lee Sang-yeob; Jung Hae-in; Ko Sung-hee
- Country of origin: South Korea
- Original language: Korean
- No. of episodes: 16

Production
- Producers: Teddy Hoon-tak Jung; Hwang Ki-yong
- Production locations: Ansan, South Korea
- Running time: 60 minutes
- Production company: SidusHQ

Original release
- Network: SBS TV
- Release: September 27 – November 16, 2017

While You Were Sleeping (Korean: 당신이 잠든 사이에; RR: Dangsini jamdeun saie) is a 2017 South Korean television series starring Lee Jong-suk, Bae Suzy, Lee Sang-yeob, Jung Hae-in, and Ko Sung-hee. Consisting of sixteen chapters distributed over 16 episodes, this legal drama-fantasy television series centers on the lives of three young adults—a field reporter, a prosecutor, and a police officer—who have acquired the ability to foresee future events through their dreams, after saving each other many years ago.

The series is directed by Oh Chung-hwan and written by Park Hye-ryun. It aired on SBS from September 27 to November 16, 2017, on Wednesdays and Thursdays at 22:00 (KST). The drama completed filming and editing before airing the pilot episode. The drama is available on online streaming services such as Netflix, Viki, KOCOWA and Viu. iQIYI also broadcasts the drama.

== Synopsis ==
While You Were Sleeping is a combination of the romance, legal drama and fantasy genres, focusing on the tale of three young adults who have acquired the ability to see the future through their dreams: field reporter Nam Hong-joo (Bae Suzy), rookie prosecutor Jung Jae-chan (Lee Jong-suk), and police officer Han Woo-tak (Jung Hae-in). Some of these dreams show crimes that Jae-chan has to investigate and others show disastrous events that one or more of them will have to endure. Conflicted by these dreams, the trio collaborate with each other to prevent their ominous dreams from turning into reality and to defeat their archenemy, the corrupt lawyer Lee Yoo-beom (Lee Sang-yeob).

== Cast ==
=== Main ===
- Lee Jong-suk as Jung Jae-chan 정재찬
  - Nam Da-reum as young Jung Jae-chan

A 29-year-old rookie prosecutor. Jae-chan was the son of Jung Il-seung, a police chief officer who was murdered by the same runaway soldier who killed Hong-joo's father. Back in his adolescent years, he was a carefree boy with no worries about his studies. After reconciling with his father, he became a changed teenager and aimed to work as a prosecutor. It was also at this age that he acquired from Hong-joo the ability to see the future through dreams, when Hong-joo saved him from drowning in a lake while preventing police officer Choi Dam-dong, the runaway soldier's older brother, from committing suicide.

Despite appearing cold and lacking a sense of humor, Jae-chan is still foolish and funny in some aspects. Since the first appearance of his future-seeing dreams, he will do everything he can to prevent them from coming true. He falls in love with Hong-joo after days of going out with each other, without knowing or recognising that she was "Bamtori", his childhood acquaintance who also lost her father to the runaway soldier (his lack of recognition was due to him remembering Hong-joo as a boy from her tomboyish mannerisms and short, boy-like haircut). He was born in April 1988, and his blood type is B. Despite all the chaos he somehow managed to fall for Nam Hong-joo and is very protective towards her.

- Bae Suzy as Nam Hong-joo 남홍주 (a.k.a. Bamtori)
  - Shin Yi-joon as young Nam Hong-joo

Born in 1988, Hong-joo is a 29-year-old journalist and field reporter who has the power of precognition (the ability to see events in the future), which takes effect while dreaming. She was once a tomboyish girl nicknamed "Bamtori" (밤톨이; lit. 'Chestnut') who aspires to become a baseball player. Since she was a child, Hong-joo has been haunted by seeing the deaths of other people in her dreams, one of which is the untimely death of her father, Nam Chul-doo, at the hands of a runaway soldier who also killed Jae-chan's father. She first met Jae-chan when both their fathers' funerals were jointly conducted on the same date in the same funeral hall. By saving Jae-chan from drowning, she had inadvertently made Jae-chan acquire the same ability that she has. Due to her short haircut and tomboyish characteristics, many people, including the reporters of the runaway soldier case and Jae-chan mistook her as a boy.

Now that she is fatherless, Hong-joo began dreaming of the impending deaths of her mother, Yoon Moon-sun, and herself: the former happening due to an accident she gets into and the latter due to her occupation as a field reporter. Like all the other dreams, she does not know when the deaths will happen; she can only guess. In her attempt to stop her dreams from becoming reality, she leaves her job and helps her mother in running a samgyeopsal restaurant. Nevertheless, she regains her resolve in doing her job as a field reporter with Jae-chan to support her in preventing their dreams from coming true. She later in the series falls in love with Jae-chan and begins dating him.

- Lee Sang-yeob as Lee Yoo-beom 이유범
  - Yeo Hoe-hyun as young Lee Yoo-beom

A 34-year-old successful and famous prosecutor turned lawyer who does not hold any attachments. Yoo-beom was Jae-chan's private tutor when Jae-chan was in his adolescence. He coaxed Jae-chan into falsifying his report cards so that they could gain money from Jae-chan's father and buy a motorcycle. With Yoo-beom driving the new motorcycle, they get into an accident and he leaves Jae-chan behind to fend for himself, an incident which made Jae-chan dislike him.

As a former prosecutor, Yoo-beom dared to falsify evidence just to finish his cases. As a lawyer, he works in Haekwang Law Firm, taking on any case that brings him a lot of money and going to whatever lengths to achieve an outcome he desires, such as fabricating evidence or manipulating testimonies even if he knows if his clients are truly guilty or innocent. He even went as far as to murder Ha Joo-an, the true culprit of the IV drip serial murders to cover up the fact that he fabricated evidence that wrongly convicted a doctor for perpertuating the 19 killings. Yoo-beom was eventually found guilty of murder and fabrication of evidence and sentenced to incarceration for life.

He was Hong-joo's boyfriend because of a blind date. However, they broke up after Jae-chan saved her from the accident that night. Yoo-beom's birthday was November 20, 1983.

- Jung Hae-in as Han Woo-tak 한우탁

A 29-year-old police officer who was the top placer in his class of aspiring policemen. Woo-tak is considered to be a handsome, intelligent, and able-bodied police officer. Although he exemplifies the ideal policeman, he keeps a secret that can jeopardize his career in the police: he is actually suffering from color blindness but an error in the assessment made his condition undetected.

Woo-tak was destined, without him knowing, to die in a car accident that Yoo-beom will cause on a snowy Valentine's Day after he delivered Yoon Moon-sun's cellphone which she left at her restaurant. Thanks to Jae-chan, who intercepted Hong-joo's car which Yoo-beom was driving, he was saved from his supposed death and acquired from him the ability to see future events through dreams. Together with Jae-chan and Hong-joo, they work together to keep their bad dreams from coming true. As the trio went on with their lives, Woo-tak began having an affection for Hong-joo, although he kept his feelings concealed, sensing that Hong-joo and Jae-chan are developing feelings for each other. His birthday was in September 1988, and his blood type is O.

=== Supporting ===
==== Division 3 ====
- Ko Sung-hee as Shin Hee-min 신희민

A female prosecutor with a charming and friendly appearance. Prosecutor Shin was Jae-chan's colleague when they were in college, but she holds a higher position than Jae-chan in the prosecution office, next to their superiors. She also has a high success rate at prosecuting criminals, though she sometimes finds it hard to accept her own mistakes, especially her failure in Kang Dae-hee's poisoning case.

- Min Sung-wook as Lee Ji-kwang

A senior prosecutor who became close to and supportive of Jae-chan. He is willing to cover up for Jae-chan and to let him borrow his personal things, even his own car. He began to secretly date fellow prosecutor Son Woo-joo. Later on, their secret affair was accidentally revealed to their co-workers when he wore by mistake Prosecutor Son's lipstick which he inadvertently switched with his lip balm.

- Bae Hae-sun as Son Woo-joo

Another senior prosecutor who was a single mother unbeknown to her co-workers. She became close to Prosecutor Lee and ended up being married to him.

- Lee Ki-young as Park Dae-young

Chief of the Prosecution Officer Division 3 who is very conscious about his division's reputation and performance. He has the same name as a mobile phone thief whom he indicted ten years ago when he was still a prosecutor.

- Kim Won-hae as Choi Dam-dong
  - Lee Jae-kyun as young Dam-dong

A police officer turned detective/inspector who works for Jae-chan in the Prosecution Office. Choi Dam-dong was the older brother of Choi wook-hyun, the runaway soldier who killed Dam-dong's chief and Jae-chan's father, Jung Il-seung, and Hong-joo's father, Nam Chul-doo. During his younger years as a police officer, he attempted to commit suicide by drowning himself in a lake out of the shame he felt for Wook-hyun's crimes. Before he completely drowns, Jae-chan and Hong-joo saved him and convinced him to move on with his life. From that moment on, he wished he could meet them once again in the future.

Now an old detective, Inspector Choi's skills as a former policeman are still in action, particularly when it comes to crime scenes. He once worked for ex-prosecutor Yoo-beom, though he was unaware of Yoo-beom's fraudulent schemes until when he began working for Jae-chan. He began supporting the unknowing Jae-chan in his investigations and gives him helpful advice. He also talks formally to Jae-chan even though he is much older than him. It is also revealed in the latter episodes of While You Were Sleeping that he had also acquired the ability to see the future through dreams, apparently from Hong-joo and Jae-chan.

- Park Jin-joo as Moon Hyang-mi

Jae-chan's assisting officer who likes handsome men but can get easily turned off.

- Son San as Min Jung-ha
- Lee Bong-ryun as Go Pil-suk

==== People around Jung Jae-chan ====
- Shin Jae-ha as Jung Seung-won, Jae-chan's 19-year-old younger brother who was born in 1998. He is the boyfriend of a famous pianist named Park So-yoon
  - Go Woo-rim as young Jung Seung-won

==== People around Nam Hong-joo ====
- Hwang Young-hee as Yoon Moon-sun, Hong-joo's widowed mother and the late Nam Chul-doo's wife; a samgyeopsal restaurant owner. She was supposed to die due to exhaustion to compensate Han Woo-tak's death (due to the fact that his death happened after he delivered her left-behind phone and she was also Hong-joo's only family) and Hong-joo's hospital bills. It is thanks to Jae-chan's intervention that averted this horrible fate and she became a caring motherly figure to Jae-chan, Woo-tak and Seung-won.

=== Others ===
- Lee Yoo-joon as Oh Kyung-han

a police officer along with Han Woo-tak; he sensed that Woo-tak had color blindness but kept the secret to himself to prevent Woo-tak from getting discharged

- Oh Eui-shik as Bong Du-hyun (SBC reporter; Hong-joo's senior)
- Huh Jun-suk as Dong-kyun (SBC reporter)
- Pyo Ye-jin as Cha Yeo-jung (Police officer who has a crush on Han Woo-tak)
- Yoo In-soo as Seung-won's classmate

=== Special appearances ===
- Kim So-hyun as Park So-yoon (Ep. 2–8, 16, 32)

a young pianist who suffers from her father Jun-mo's abusiveness; Seung-won's girlfriend

- Jang So-yeon as Do Geum-sook, So-yoon's mother (Ep. 3–8)

So-yoon's mother who is fearful and submissive to her abusive husband Jun-mo

- Um Hyo-sup as Park Jun-mo, So-yoon's father (Ep. 3–8)

So-yoon's abusive father; Lawyer Lee Yoo-beom's regular client

- Choi Won-young as Nam Chul-doo, Hong-joo's father (Ep. 3–4)

Hong-joo's deceased father; a bus driver who was killed by the runaway soldier who also killed Jung Il-seung

- Jang Hyun-sung as Jung Il-seung, Jae-chan's father (Ep. 1, 5–8)

Jae-chan's deceased father; the former police chief officer of Il-yoo Police Station before he was killed by the runaway soldier (his subordinate Choi Dam-dong's younger brother) who also killed Nam Chul-doo

- Hong Kyung as Choi Wook-hyun (Ep. 3, 6, 29, 31)

a soldier who deserted from the army and during the escape, he used a rifle to kill Jae-chan's father and detonated a grenade on a bus, causing both himself and Hong-joo's father to die in the explosion. It is later revealed that he was the younger brother of Choi Dam-dong.

- Lee Jung-eun as Jae-chan's mother (Ep. 5–6)
- Kim Da-ye as Kang Cho-hee (Ep. 10–13, 15, 32)

Dae-hee's younger sister, an employee in a coffee shop. Her brother Dae-hee had killed her second brother Byung-hee for insurance. She was originally set to be murdered by Dae-hee for her insurance as well but survived the murderous rampage with Hong-joo and Woo-tak's help

- Kang Ki-young as Kang Dae-hee (Ep. 9–13)

Cho-hee's older brother; a chicken restaurant owner who killed his younger brother for his insurance; one of Lawyer Lee Yoo-beom's clients; initially acquitted of killing his brother, he was once again arrested and after a retrial, he receives a life sentence for his brother's murder in the end

- Kang Shin-hyo as College student (Ep. 10)
- Shim Wan-joon as Bearded man
- Shin Eun-jung as Kim Joo-young, judge (Ep. 11–12)
- Lee Do-gyeom as Myung Dae-gu (Ep. 13, 24–32)

Seung-won's classmate and son of Myung Yi-suk, a doctor who was falsely accused as the culprit of an intravenous drip serial killing of 19 hospital patients. Even after his father was convicted and sentenced to life imprisonment and after his father's death by suicide, Dae-gu sought to help his father prove his innocence, and he harboured a strong sense of hatred towards Yoo-beom ever since

- Baek Sung-hyun as Do Hak-young (Ep. 13–17)

Woo-tak's high school roommate and internet installer who was falsely accused of being the culprit behind Yoo Soo-kyung's sudden death

- Cha Jung-won as Yoo Soo-kyung (Ep. 13–16)

a nationally renowned athlete in archery who is very much loved by the people around her because of her virtuousness and generosity. She died when an attack of fainting spells due to otolithiasis caused her to collapse and injure her head, leading to severe cerebral hemorrhage.

- Jeon Kuk-hwan as Yoo Man-ho (Ep. 15–18, 32)

a skilled marksman who is suffering from pancreatic cancer and is in terminal condition. He is Soo-kyung's father, becoming one of Lawyer Lee Yoo-beom's clients for her daughter's case.

- Go Woo-rim as Chan-ho (Ep. 19–21, 32)

Prosecutor Son's son who suffers from chronic kidney failure

- Lee Ga-ryeong as hospital administrator in charge of organ donation who tells Son Woo-joo about a kidney donor for her son (Ep. 21 19:15)
- Moon Yong-suk as Lee Hwan (Ep. 19–24)

Professor Moon Tae-min's teaching assistant and an organ donor to seven patients (including Chan-ho). He was one of the victims of Professor Moon's abusiveness, from which he got his injured arm. He was secretly killed by Professor Moon after he attempted to reveal Professor Moon's wrongdoings during a book launching activity.

- Kim Ki-cheon as Hwan's father (Ep. 21–24, 32)
- Ryu Tae-ho as Moon Tae-min (Ep. 21–24)

a seemingly benevolent professor and writer who is abusive to his students and subordinates in reality. He secretly killed Lee Hwan after a book launching ceremony. He is one of Lawyer Lee Yoo-beom's clients.

- Yoon Kyun-sang as couple in meadow (Ep. 21)
- Lee Sung-kyung as couple in meadow (Ep. 21)
- Lee Ju-seok as the Judge (Ep. 21–22)
- Yoon Yong-hyun as Park Dae-young, a mobile thief (Ep. 25–26)

a mailman turned thief whose nine-year-old daughter became paralyzed after a car accident. With her daughter needing constant care at home, he abandoned his job and resorted to stealing mobile phones. He has the same name as the prosecutor who sent him behind bars. Her daughter died ten years ago while he was in jail.
Dae-young continued his crime even after he was out of jail and stole Ha Joo-an's phone in the process. He copied Joo-an's files in a flash drive before giving it to Jae-chan for investigation.

- Lee Jae-won (actor) as Jo Yoon-pyo (Ep. 25–26)

Ha Joo-an's accomplice who knew about Joo-an's crime. He was asked to retrieve the phone which contained the photos of Joo-an's 19 victims. He was then killed by Joo-an after he got caught by the police.

- Lee Eun-woo as Ha Joo-an (Ep. 28–29)

the real culprit of a seriously dreaded intravenous drip serial killing of 19 hospital patients. She was a bed-ridden patient suffering from Crohn's disease. Out of her intense animosity towards her fellow patients who were already about to be discharged, she injected her first 11 victims with Vecaron. She killed her remaining eight targets in the same manner after the arrest of the doctor Myung Yi-suk, who was first assumed to be the culprit of the crime. She also kept photos of her victims in her phone, which was stolen by the thief Park Dae-young and the contents revealed to Jae-chan and his team. During her appearances in the show, Joo-an had never shown any tinge of remorse for her actions. She was killed by Lawyer Lee Yoo-beom, who threw her off the building and let her fall to her death after she attempted to murder Hong-joo.

- Son Byong-ho as Lawyer Ko Sung-ho, Representative of Haekwang Law Firm (Ep. 29–31)

== Episodes ==
No.	Title	Directed by	Written by	Original release date
1	"While You Were Sleeping"	Oh Choong-hwan	Park Hye-ryeon	September 27, 2017
The series opens with Hong-joo waking up from a dream where she hugs and expresses her gratitude to a wounded stranger in a crossroads on a snowy night. Just in time, the stranger in her dream, Jae-chan, arrives in their neighborhood with his younger brother Jung Seung-won (Shin Jae-ha) and moves in a house across theirs. While working with her mother Yoon Moon-sun (Hwang Young-hee) in their samgyeopsal restaurant, Hong-joo meets a chain smoker whom she dreamed of and was destined to die at a gasoline station. Hong-joo is unnerved when the smoker dies in the way she had dreamed and by another dream in which her mother was destined to die in an accident Hong-joo is about to get into; this pushes her to cut off her hair because she had long hair in the dream. On his first day at the Division 3 Prosecutors' Office, Jae-chan meets Lawyer Lee Yoo-beom whom he secretly loathes because of a bitter incident dating back to when he was a teenager. One night, Jae-chan dreams that Yoo-beom takes Hong-joo on a date. In the dream, Hong-joo excuses herself to go home thinking that she left the door at their house ajar. As it unexpectedly started snowing heavily, Yoo-beom insists on driving Hong-joo's car and during the drive he gets into an accident in which a policeman is killed. Yoo-beom claims that Hong-joo was driving, dragging her while unconscious into the driver's seat and falsifying evidence. When she wakes up from a coma, months later, Hong-joo is wrongly accused of the accident, and learns that her mother died of exhaustion working to pay the damages claimed by the victim's family. In vain, she protests her innocence to Jae-chan, the prosecutor in charge of the case in the dream, and ends up committing suicide, Jae-Chan being unable to stop her from jumping off the hospital roof. When Jae-chan senses that his dream is about to come true on a snowy night on Valentine's Day, he follows Yoo-beom and Hong-joo and, using his own vehicle, intercepts Hong-joo's car just before Yoo-beom can accidentally hit Han Woo-tak, the policeman in the dream. Yoo-beom rebukes Jae-chan, thinking it was a form of revenge, but Hong-joo hugs and expresses her gratitude to him in just the way she had dreamed.
2	"The Good, The Bad, and The Weird"	Oh Choong-hwan	Park Hye-ryeon	September 28, 2017
Although incredulous, Jae-chan learns that he shares the same future-seeing ability as Hong-joo though they do not know why they have to see each other in their dreams. The skeptical Jae-chan thinks that Hong-joo is crazy and he persists in denying the existence of such dreams. Meanwhile, high school piano virtuosa Park So-yoon (Kim So-hyun), who is Seung-won's love interest, has her piano recital. While being interviewed by the media, her mother Do Geum-sook (Jang So-yeon) faints, causing confusion at the venue. The police and the media see what seemed like footprints on Geum-sook's undergarments while So-yoon's father Park Jun-mo (Um Hyo-sup) tries to cover it and insists that he did not do it. So-yoon realizes that her father, who had been abusive to them, had beaten up her mother again. As Jun-mo is being arrested by the police, So-yoon pleads with Seung-won to pretend that he does not know about her father's cruelty. Lawyer Yoo-beom takes Jun-mo's case at once and falsifies evidence and testimony to make it impossible to prosecute the case. Goaded by the discreet admonishments from his seniors in the prosecution office, Jae-chan becomes disappointed that he cannot fully investigate Jun-mo's case and satirically declares the case cannot be prosecuted. Knowing that her father will win once again in the case, So-yoon plans to kill her father by poisoning him. Seung-won becomes aware of her plans, though he insists to her that she must report it to the police. Shortly afterwards, Jae-chan dreams for a second time. This time, he sees Seung-won being carried away by the police and Hong-joo resenting him for not believing the precognitive power of their dreams. Distraught, Jae-chan tells Hong-joo of his dream, and he is surprised when Hong-joo tells him of her dream. In Hong-joo's dream, she saw a man abusing his wife just before Seung-won interferes, pushes the man off the balcony, and blames Jae-chan for his becoming a murderer. Just in time, Seung-won catches So-yoon in a store searching for poisonous chemicals, and he asks her to go home with him.
3	"Secretly, Greatly"	Oh Choong-hwan	Park Hye-ryeon	October 4, 2017
Knowing that their dreams will come true soon, Jae-chan and Hong-joo analyze their dreams and realize that they are related to Park Jun-mo's domestic abuse case, which Jae-chan had declared could not be prosecuted. So-yoon receives a call from her mother. Sensing that something bad is about to happen, Seung-won and So-yoon rush to the Park residence, located in a high rise apartment. Jae-chan and Hong-joo also dash to the residence to stop them. Meanwhile, police officer Han Woo-tak begins having precognitive dreams after Jae-chan saves him from getting killed in the Valentine's Day car accident. In his first dream while sleeping in their patrol car, he sees himself arresting a high school boy (Seung-won), who was pleading for innocence, and Jae-chan screaming to the police to set the boy free. Just in time, he sees Jae-chan and Hong-joo running through the streets. Sensing that the dream is about to come true, he follows them to the Park residence. In the Park residence, Geum-sook pleads for divorce, asking Jun-mo to pay for So-yoon's education abroad. Jun-mo arrogantly rejects her offer, but just before he starts beating her up, Hong-joo sets off a false alarm, prompting all the occupants to exit the building. Jae-chan catches Seung-won, who rebukes him for being lax about Jun-mo's case. To hide from Jun-mo, So-yoon and Geum-sook escape to Hong-joo's residence, accompanied by Woo-tak who offers them a ride on his patrol car. Jae-chan, then, decides to reopen Jun-mo's case, despite getting scolded by his chief. Soon after the ruckus at the Park residence, Woo-tak sees another vision in his sleep. He sees himself and his police partner Oh Kyung-han (Lee Yoo-joon) going to Hong-joo's samgyeopsal restaurant. In the dream, Lawyer Yoo-beom arrives in the restaurant to convince So-yoon and Geum-sook to withdraw their appeal to prosecute Jun-mo so that So-yoon can retain her reputation as a pianist. Frustrated and willing to give up her career for their family to be peaceful again, So-yoon attempts to injure her hand with a chopstick but Hong-joo interferes and gets her hand impaled instead. To prevent the tragedy from happening and also to express his gratitude for saving his life, Woo-tak invites Jae-chan instead to the restaurant. During their meal, Jae-chan gets curious upon seeing Woo-tak counting down from five. Just in time, the door opens, and Yoo-beom arrives to meet So-yoon and Geum-sook.
4	"A Few Good Men"	Oh Choong-hwan	Park Hye-ryeon	October 5, 2017
Woo-tak is amazed that his dream is already happening exactly as it is, except that he was having a meal with Jae-chan, not Kyung-han. Jae-chan overhears the conversation between Yoo-beom, So-yoon, and Geum-sook, and just before the accident happens, Jae-chan intervenes in the argument and promises So-yoon and Geum-sook that he will prosecute Jun-mo in every way he can. Woo-tak learns from Jae-chan and Hong-joo about their precognitive dreams although the trio are still curious about why, out of the many people around them, they were the ones chosen to have such dreams. Jae-chan starts the investigation and gathers as much evidence as possible. Later on, Woo-tak and Hong-joo both dream about Jun-mo's case and persuades Jae-chan to let his co-worker, Inspector Choi Dam-dong (Kim Won-hae), to do the interrogation first. Jae-chan lets Inspector Choi do the investigation despite his suspicions about him siding with Yoo-beom who already prepared fabricated evidence and claims as Jun-mo's attorney. Unexpectedly, Inspector Choi was able to deduce the truth out of Jun-mo and Jae-chan prosecutes him successfully to Yoo-beom's disappointment. Jae-chan senses that Inspector Choi is unbiased, meticulous, and accountable in his work and apologizes for his doubt about him.
5	"Don't Trust Her"	Oh Choong-hwan	Park Hye-ryeon	October 11, 2017
Meanwhile, Hong-joo has long been discomfited by one recurring dream, which shows herself wearing a blue jacket-like field reporter's uniform and lying apparently dead on a grassy terrain during a rainy night. It was the dream which compelled her to leave her job as a field reporter in SBC and to work alongside her mother in their restaurant. However, Hong-joo intends to return to work after concluding that she can change the future portrayed in their dreams, but her mother is against her plans out of her fear that her dream might actually come true. To convince her mother, Hong-joo brings a fire extinguisher and saves coffee shop attendant Kang Cho-hee (Kim Da-ye) who was bound to be burned to her death in a fire. Jae-chan and Woo-tak, who dreamed about the same incident, works together to keep Hong-joo safe. On the other hand, the Division 3 Prosecutors' Office (including Inspector Choi) investigates a car accident case involving Cho-hee's older brothers. The younger of these two brothers, Kang Byung-hee, apparently died when the other, Kang Dae-hee (Kang Ki-young), drove the vehicle. The seemingly distressed Dae-hee refused an autopsy to be done to his brother's corpse and requested it to be cremated. Later on, Hong-joo's reluctant mother personally asks Jae-chan to protect Hong-joo and invites him to have breakfast every day at their house. On Hong-joo's first day back at work, her co-worker Bong Du-hyun (Oh Eui-sik) presents to her the new field reporters' new uniform: the blue jacket-like attire she saw in her death dream.
6	"City of the Blind"	Oh Choong-hwan	Park Hye-ryeon	October 12, 2017
After his younger brother's cremation, Kang Dae-hee goes to Lawyer Lee Yoo-beom and, offering him a big sum of money, reveals to him that he had actually killed his brother Byung-hee so that he can claim his insurance. He had mixed Byung-hee's herbal drink with potassium cyanide and crashed his car to make the scene look like a car accident. Meanwhile, Jae-chan dreams of himself and Hong-joo watching the latter reporting on TV that a man named Kang Dae-hee was proven guilty of killing both of his younger brother and younger sister for their insurance money and consequently sentenced to life imprisonment. The next day, during a meeting between him and his colleagues, Jae-chan learns at the prosecution office that Dae-hee is already accused of killing his younger brother for the insurance, and that Dae-hee's younger sister (Cho-hee) is still alive. At her work, Hong-joo began covering a serial poisoning case of about 100 cats around Seoul. To prosecute Dae-hee, Jae-chan's fellow prosecutor Shin Hee-min (Ko Sung-hee) takes the case but her arguments get overruled by Yoo-beom's which claim that Hee-min's evidence are insignificant to charge Dae-hee, who was then acquitted. On the other hand, Jae-chan gets worried after dreaming once again, this time seeing Dae-hee attacking Hong-joo and his sister Cho-hee at a building rooftop. Hong-joo, who was still gathering data about the serial cat poisoning, goes with Woo-tak to a chicken restaurant where she once saw a man feeding cats, not knowing that it was actually Dae-hee. With Dae-hee on the loose, Jae-chan recalls at work the two dreams he recently had. He also remembers that Hong-joo was covering a cat poisoning case and notes that he saw in the first dream a pouch with a straw, one of the evidences that proved Dae-hee's crime. When Jae-chan speculates the possibility of poisoning, Inspector Choi recalls that the wounds and blood stains on the victim's corpse were pinkish and near orange (instead of blueish red), a sign of potassium cyanide poisoning. To apprehend Dae-hee, Jae-chan and Inspector Choi request for backup and rush to the site of the incident in his second dream, just in time to see Woo-tak already grievously wounded and Dae-hee about to attack Hong-joo and Cho-hee at the rooftop.
7	"A Secret That Can't Be Told"	Oh Choong-hwan	Park Hye-ryeon	October 18, 2017
As the ambulance arrives to rescue Woo-tak, Jae-chan and Inspector Choi arrest Dae-hee, saving Hong-joo and Cho-hee. The murder case was reopened and with Jae-chan taking over it, he gathers all evidences of the crime, which also points Dae-hee as the culprit of the serial cat poisoning. Kang Dae-hee is finally convicted of murder in the re-trial and Jae-chan successfully sought a life sentence for the killer. After the struggle with Dae-hee, Jae-chan and Hong-joo decide to recompense Woo-tak until his recovery for his efforts to keep Hong-joo safe. Previously, it was Jae-chan who requested Woo-tak to watch over Hong-joo after he saw the two dreams on Dae-hee. Steadily, Woo-tak is having an affection for Hong-joo, although he is keeping his feelings concealed sensing that Hong-joo and Jae-chan are developing feelings for each other. Hong-joo also sees another dream where Jae-chan crosses the street at night, carrying a couples ring for her. Soon after Woo-tak's recovery, Hong-joo and Woo-tak dream about Do Hak-young (Baek Sung-hyun), the latter's roommate and friend in high school who works as an internet installer. In Hong-joo's dream, Hak-young barges in Woo-tak's house at night and asks for his help in a case he gets involved in. In Woo-tak's, he saw himself being interrogated by Jae-chan because of Hak-young. A worried Hong-joo checks up on Woo-tak, shortly before Hak-young actually arrives in his house. Hak-young reveals to Woo-tak that he has been falsely accused of the murder of athlete Yoo Soo-kyung (Cha Jung-won), who was one of his clients. Right after Hak-young had finished fixing Soo-kyung's internet connection, the latter was found dead on her own pool of gore with a mysterious geometrical figure drawn on the floor with her blood. Woo-tak, then, urges Hak-young to turn himself in and to trust the law after Hak-young swears that he may disclose to the police the secret Woo-tak has been hiding.
8	"Pride and Prejudice"	Oh Choong-hwan	Park Hye-ryeon	October 19, 2017
With the public enraged by Soo-kyung's sudden death, Jae-chan investigates the crime at once and cross-examines Woo-tak to find out more about the suspect Do Hak-young's past. He gradually thinks that Hak-young is actually innocent, though he is still clueless about the geometrical figure on the floor which was impossible for a person to create within a short period of time. The autopsy results also showed that Soo-kyung has a history of otolithiasis, that she died out of cerebral hemorrhage, and that she had no scars on her body except for a wound on her head. On the other hand, Lawyer Yoo-beom involves himself in the case as the plaintiff for the Yoo family, insisting that Jae-chan is being too time-consuming with the case. Yoo-beom also tries to persuade Hong-joo to make an online article revealing Hak-young's personal information so that she can "help" in finding evidence against Hak-young using social media. Nevertheless, Hong-joo considers Hak-young's personal information irrelevant to the case and refuses to post them in media. With the lack of evidence, Jae-chan sets Hak-young free. Soon after, Hong-joo gets distressed when the dream showing Jae-chan gifting her a ring gets altered, now revealing that he will be stabbed by an unknown man just before he was able to cross the street and express his love for her.
9	"The Usual Suspect"	Oh Choong-hwan	Park Hye-ryeon	October 25, 2017
Hong-joo and her mother, Woo-tak, and Seung-won all feel saddened to hear about Jae-chan's forthcoming disaster. Hong-joo also suspects that the change in her dream is attributed to Hak-young's release. In addition, the public is in outrage with the prosecution with Jae-chan being the subject of every criticism about Hak-young's case, especially in social media. When the criticisms seemed to be out of hand, Hong-joo opens a link in one of the comments for an anti-Jae-chan article (유수경 살인 사건 현장에 핏자국을 보니까 떠오르는 사진; English: The bloodstains at the scene of Yoo Soo-kyung's murder case reminds me of a photo), leading to a picture of a robot vacuum cleaner running over a dog's excrement creating a geometric pattern on the floor similar to the blood pattern in Yoo Soo-kyung's case. At the same time, Soo-kyung's housekeeper, whom Jae-chan was interrogating as a witness, also mentions of a robot vacuum cleaner which, according to Inspector Choi, was not found among the items inside the victim's residence. Putting the clues together, however, Inspector Choi infers that Soo-kyung could have fainted due to her otolithiasis and lost a lot of blood out of a head injury upon her fall, while the robot vacuum cleaner ran over the pool of blood, created the pattern on the floor, and strayed outside the house (making the inspection team unable to retrieve it). To prove their hypothesis, Jae-chan traced the item with Inspector Choi and found it in an e-waste disposal facility with the help of Hong-joo (with co-worker Bong Du-hyun) and Woo-tak (with fellow policeman Oh Kyung-han). Yoo Soo-kyung's blood was found in it, attesting their claim and proving Hak-young's innocence. Upon a request from Woo-tak, Hong-joo gives Hak-young a chance to make a public appeal of his innocence to be broadcast in the media. Later, upon hearing Jae-chan's success in Hak-young's case in the news, Lawyer Lee Yoo-beom implicitly goads Yoo Soo-kyung's father, skilled marksman Yoo Man-ho (Jeon Kuk-hwan) who was already suffering from a later stage of pancreatic cancer, into going against Jae-chan. He had given him stolen photos of Woo-tak, Hak-young, and Jae-chan and speculated a bribery between the three. On the other hand, Jae-chan learns that Hong-joo was his childhood acquaintance "Bamtori" (밤톨이; lit. 'Chestnut') whose father was murdered by the same culprit who killed Jae-chan's. Jae-chan buys an engagement ring so that he can propose to Hong-joo, but the latter's dream comes true in a different set-up: before Jae-chan could cross the street, Yoo Man-ho arrives in a car and shoots Jae-chan right in front of Hong-joo.
10	"Boy Meets Girl"	Oh Choong-hwan	Park Hye-ryeon	October 26, 2017
After shooting Jae-chan, Yoo Man-ho finds Woo-tak and Hak-young and attempts to ram them with his car. As Woo-tak and Hak-young were about to get killed, the police apprehend Yoo Man-ho but finds him unconscious inside his car. Jae-chan is rushed to the hospital for emergency treatment and he improves from his injury. Man-ho is also confined to the hospital due to his worsening pancreatic cancer. Yoo-beom is also brought in by the prosecution for interrogation for instigating Yoo Man-ho to assassinate Jae-chan, in which Yoo-beom accused the prosecution of fabricating the evidence that it was the robot cleaner who ran over Soo-kyung's blood pool and created the pattern in order to irresponsibly clear Hak-young's name. The prosecutors looking at the interrogation from another room, including Yoo-beom's former colleagues, had begun to realise Yoo-beom's true colours. Hong-joo receives the engagement ring from the still confined Jae-chan, but along with it is a note which she had given to a childhood acquaintance whose father was killed by the same person who killed hers when she was still a teenager. She realizes that Jae-chan was that childhood acquaintance, whose father Police Chief Officer Jung Il-seung (Jang Hyun-sung) was killed by a runaway soldier who also killed her father Nam Chul-doo (Choi Won-young), a bus driver. Thirteen years ago, the deaths of Hong-joo's father and Jae-chan's father were given the same funeral, since their deaths happened at the same day and from the same culprit. It was during the funeral when Hong-joo, a.k.a. Bamtori, met Jae-chan. Teenagers Hong-joo and Jae-chan ran into a teary-eyed police officer, who was the culprit's older brother. The policeman, who was also Chief Jung's subordinate, asked for forgiveness but the bereaved teenagers rebuked him. Deeply ashamed of his younger brother's crimes, the policeman ran away and attempted to commit suicide by drowning himself in a lake. Jae-chan decided to save the policeman with Hong-joo's help, but while he was underwater Hong-joo hesitated out of her anger towards the policeman. As Jae-chan and the policeman were about to completely drown, Hong-joo rids herself of all resentment and pulls them out of the water. Because of these bad memories, especially of nearly killing Jae-chan in the lake, Hong-joo hesitates to wear the ring Jae-chan gave her. Feeling sad about it, Hong-joo reveals to Jae-chan what really happened at the lake, telling him that it pains her to see him, the boy she nearly killed. As Hong-joo attends a book launching ceremony, Jae-chan intends to interrogate Yoo Man-ho for what he had done to him. Accompanied by Prosecutor Shin, Jae-chan suddenly remembers his teenage years with Hong-joo and feels a change of heart. He clarifies, instead, to Man-ho the truth about Yoo Soo-kyung's case. Subsequently, Jae-chan escapes from the hospital to search for Hong-joo and reveal his feelings for her, despite the rain and his still sensitive gunshot wound. Hong-joo, who instantly dreamt about what Jae-chan will do, rushes to the hospital and comes across him shortly after. Jae-chan discloses to Hong-joo that he also felt the same resentment and hesitation as her back then. Jae-chan and Hong-joo finally profess their love for each other and share a kiss.
11	"To Die or to be Bad"	Oh Choong-hwan	Park Hye-ryeon	November 1, 2017
Meanwhile, Lawyer Yoo-beom receives a call from a new client, professor-novelist Moon Tae-min (Ryu Tae-ho) who has recently finished his launch party for his new book. During this party, his teaching assistant Lee Hwan (Moon Yong-suk) revealed his being abusive to his students and subordinates. Professor Moon then secretly strangled Lee Hwan and pushed him down a derelict elevator shaft. With the crime finished, Professor Moon becomes apprehensive when he notices a child's cap lying nearby on the floor, implying that someone saw him killing his teaching assistant. The victim is already brain-dead in the hospital, can ultimately die within a week, and is a prospective organ donor to seven patients, while the witness is a five-year-old kindergartner. In line with Professor Moon's case, Hong-joo and Woo-tak both dream of Jae-chan resigning from his job. In Hong-joo's dream, Jae-chan conducts an autopsy and successfully prosecutes Professor Moon, but the seven patients waiting for the transplant perish in return. In Woo-tak's version, Jae-chan agrees with the organ transplant and reveals in court that Professor Moon is the culprit, but with no autopsy done, Professor Moon is acquitted from the murder charge while Lee Hwan's father (Kim Ki-cheon) blames Jae-chan for Professor Moon's release. Although hesitant, Hong-joo tells Jae-chan about the dreams. After having their days off, Hong-joo and Jae-chan decide to face the situation no matter what. Just in time, Woo-tak arrests Professor Moon, who was already assaulting the kindergartner witness. To prevent Hong-joo and Woo-tak's dreams from coming true, Jae-chan decides to let the autopsy be done after the organ transplant since the injuries that Lee Hwan had were all contained to his head only.
12	"Knocking on Heaven's Door"	Oh Choong-hwan	Park Hye-ryeon	November 2, 2017
Jae-chan begins with the lawsuit against Professor Moon. While Yoo-beom kept on asserting Professor Moon's innocence, Jae-chan interrogates the kindergartner, using childlike language to establish rapport with the child. With the help of senior prosecutor Son Woo-joo (Bae Hae-sun), the credibility of the autopsy results and the possibility of a transplant be done before an autopsy were proven. Nevertheless, Yoo-beom argues that the surgeon should be blamed for Lee Hwan's death since Lee Hwan's cardiac death happened after the transplant, not after Professor Moon's crime (cardiac death is the favored kind of death in courts than brain death). Hong-joo and Lee Hwan's father vehemently protests on Yoo-beom's argument. Jae-chan strongly asserted the baselessness of such claim, emphasizing that Professor Moon's crime would have led to Lee Hwan's ultimate cardiac death even without the organ transplant. Professor Moon is finally prosecuted of murder and is sentenced to seven years' imprisonment (much to the disappointment of Jae-chan, who earlier argued for a sentence of ten years' jail). With the future once again changed, Jae-chan and Hong-joo spend an intimate moment at the beach.
13	"We're On Our Way to Meet You Now"	Oh Choong-hwan	Park Hye-ryeon	November 8, 2017
At the beach, Jae-chan and Hong-joo wonder if they could still meet the police officer they saved at the lake thirteen years ago. Jae-chan supposes that they could have crossed their paths with him once though they could have not recognized him. After Professor Moon's case, Lawyer Yoo-beom invites Inspector Choi and Jae-chan's assisting officer Moon Hyang-mi (Park Jin-joo) to work at Yoo-beom's company, the Haekwang Law Firm. Inspector Choi refuses the offer and chooses to stay. Jae-chan, who learns from Hyang-mi about Yoo-beom's offer, tries to convince Inspector Choi not to quit his job. Meanwhile, Jae-chan receives from his younger brother Seung-won the last will of Dr. Myung Yi-suk, the father of Seung-won's classmate Myung Dae-gu and the supposed culprit of an intravenous drip serial killing case of 11 hospital patients. Years ago, it was Yoo-beom who handled the case when he was still a prosecutor, and the case earned him an award from the Public Prosecutor General. Recently, Myung Yi-suk, who was subsequently convicted and punished with a life sentence, committed suicide inside his prison cell and left a note saying that he was falsely accused of the crime. On the other hand, Hong-joo is tasked to cover prosecution work for a TV program in SBC titled "Three-Day Experience." At first, she covered Prosecutor Shin in her daily activities. For the night shift, she covered Jae-chan who was interrogating a cellphone thief whose paralytic nine-year-old daughter died when he was in jail a decade ago. The thief, then, gives him a flash drive, which contains files from one of the phones he recently pocketed. Upon investigating the flash drive, Inspector Choi Dam-dong uncovers photos of 19 hospital patients, 11 of which were the victims of the Myung Yi-suk intravenous drip serial killing case. The prosecution team deduces that the real culprit is still at large, and Inspector Choi bitterly realizes that Yoo-beom had fabricated the evidences, leading to Myung Yi-suk being indicted instead. Later, Jae-chan and Hong-joo, who were looking for the cellphone owner, gets trapped in a fire. Inspector Choi arrives at the scene and saves the couple from burning to their deaths.
14	"Catch Me If You Can"	Oh Choong-hwan	Park Hye-ryeon	November 9, 2017
While being rushed with Hong-joo to the hospital, Jae-chan wonders how Inspector Choi managed to find them. Upon reporting back to their works, Jae-chan and Hong-joo learns that the remaining eight patients in the 19 photos were killed after Myung Yi-suk's arrest, further proving the existence of a real culprit, which they infer also as the culprit behind the arson that nearly killed them. Jae-chan and another senior prosecutor Lee Ji-kwang (Min Sung-wook) are instructed to reinvestigate the intravenous drip serial killing case, while Prosecutors Son and Shin are directed to inspect the arson case. With the reopening of the IV drip killings, it is assumed that there is an error in Yoo-beom and Inspector Choi's investigation, but Jae-chan strongly believes in Inspector Choi's innocence. On the other hand, Yoo-beom began receiving ominous text messages from an unknown source, asking him if he really manipulated the evidences for the IV drip serial killing case. He was also interviewed by Hong-joo who told him that she already knew that something went wrong with the case and that he could be the one to be blamed. Yoo-beom decides to unmask the secret texter by meeting him up at his office late at night. Just as the prosecution and Hong-joo's reporting team found out that it was actually a woman who owned the phone and bought the gasoline used for the arson, the secret texter and the real culprit of the serial killing, Ha Joo-an (Lee Na-ra), revealed herself to Yoo-beom. Joo-an discloses to Yoo-beom her bitter past which lead her to doing such a heinous crime. She was a bed-ridden patient having Crohn's disease, and she utterly despised her fellow patients who were already being discharged from the hospital. Even though she knew it was extremely evil, she injected her first 11 victims with fatal amounts of Vecaron and, after Myung Yi-suk's arrest, killed in the same manner the remaining eight. She did not even care if she will be punished, but with Yoo-beom prosecuting another person instead of her, she sensed a feeling of hope for the first time. Now that the case is being reinvestigated, she knew the Yoo-beom's fame as a lawyer may be ruined soon, and during the whole conversation, Joo-an was remorseless about the deaths of the 19 innocent people whom she murdered. Completely distraught, Yoo-beom plans to put Hong-joo in a trap so that the secret of the case will only be kept between him and Joo-an. At the prosecution office, Jae-chan discovers that Inspector Choi was the policeman he and Hong-joo saved from committing suicide in the lake. Inspector Choi was the older brother of the young runaway soldier who murdered Jae-chan and Hong-joo's fathers. When Jae-chan seeks to be reconciled with him, the former policeman quits from his job as an inspector after days of tolerating the suspicions and rumors about him manipulating the evidences in the IV drip killing case. He leaves his resignation letter to Jae-chan, pleading his innocence from the accusations. Yoo-beom invites Hong-joo for a late-night interview, minutes before a scheduled power interruption in the building. Before she arrived, he placed a sleeping pill in her cup of coffee. Unknowing that it was already the fulfillment of the dream of her impending death, Hong-joo drinks her coffee and collapses, nearly unconscious. She was, then, carried by Yoo-beom and Joo-an to the law firm's rooftop garden under the heavy rain.
15	"Stand by Me"	Oh Choong-hwan	Park Hye-ryeon	November 15, 2017
While being drugged by Joo-an, Hong-joo spoke as if talking to Jae-chan so that he will find out through dreaming the exact time and place of her impending death. Minutes before, Jae-chan dreams exactly as how the incident would happen and rushes to save Hong-joo, asking back-up from Woo-tak and the rest of the police. As Woo-tak and the reinforcements arrive first, Yoo-beom decides to kill Joo-an to rid of all suspicions. He took a sleeping pill so that he can pretend that he had been drugged also by Joo-an. Before Joo-an can defend herself, he pushed her off the building just as Woo-tak reached the rooftop. Jae-chan arrives next and immediately resuscitates Hong-joo before the ambulance arrived to rescue her and Yoo-beom. At the hospital, Yoo-beom wakes up and tells the police detectives his fake story, but he suddenly felt nervous upon learning that Hong-joo also recovered, thanks to Jae-chan's early response. Jae-chan gets furious upon hearing that Yoo-beom had played victim, but Inspector Choi arrives to comfort him and to advise him not to act rashly. Later, Hong-joo is discharged and is placed under witness protection, while the prosecution prepares for the lawsuit against Yoo-beom, who will be defended by his boss, Lawyer Ko Sung-ho (Son Byong-ho). Yoo-beom will be charged by the prosecution of evidence tampering, attempted murder of Hong-joo, and the murder of Ha Joo-an. As the lawsuit verges to its opening, Woo-tak gets anxious after dreaming the fates of the three witnesses to be summoned to court: Inspector Choi telling his part in the investigation of the IV drip killing case, Hong-joo's statements getting impeached, and finally his own long-hidden secret going to be exposed. The evidence lists were read and reviewed on the first day of the lawsuit, with Jae-chan and senior prosecutor Lee Ji-kwang representing the prosecution. Lawyer Ko disagreed with the statements presented by Inspector Choi, Hong-joo, and Woo-tak and requested to the judges for a subpoena to be imposed on the three. Before the day of the next trial, Hong-joo, Jae-chan, and Woo-tak spend time with each other. While Hong-joo excused herself to answer a call, Jae-chan and Woo-tak revealed to one another that both of them had feelings for Hong-joo and decided to keep their friendship going nevertheless. On the next trial, cross-examination of the witnesses began with Inspector Choi. As what Woo-tak had dreamt, Inspector Choi admits that he is part of the inspection of the seized items related to the IV drip serial killing case. He told the court that he was with Yoo-beom when he rechecked the seized items and saw three bottles of Vecaron, which were not among the items before. When Lawyer Ko nearly destroys his credibility as witness, Jae-chan won the juries over by emphasizing the fact the Yoo-beom have fabricated evidences to gain fame and a position in Lawyer Ko's law firm. Hong-joo was interrogated next and, as what Woo-tak had dreamt, her statements get impeached since Lawyer Ko insisted that she had been drugged and could have only been hallucinating. To counter the argument, Jae-chan impeaches Yoo-beom's statements since the latter declares that he was also drugged by Joo-an and, thus, should be assumed to be hallucinating also during the incident. During a break in the trial, Hong-joo is worried that Woo-tak may incorrectly describe the umbrellas (Yoo-beom's green umbrella and Joo-an's red umbrella), which were important pieces of evidence that Woo-tak saw at the rooftop. While waiting for his turn to be cross-examined, Woo-tak realizes that Hong-joo knew all along his secret: that he is suffering from color blindness, which is strictly unacceptable for policemen and one of the grounds for dismissal.
16	"Goodbye, My Friend"	Oh Choong-hwan	Park Hye-ryeon	November 16, 2017
While Hong-joo talks to Woo-tak about the umbrellas and Woo-tak's colorblindness, Inspector Choi informs Jae-chan and Ji-kwang that Yoo-beom plans to escape from Korea after the trial. Later, Woo-tak is being questioned and reveals his color blindness, even though it will cost him his career as a police officer, shocking Jae-chan and everybody in the court. Before Lawyer Ko can impeach his statements, though, he demonstrates that even though he is colorblind, he can describe the umbrellas accurately by their shades and form. By describing the shape of the umbrellas and using Yoo-beom's green necktie and the red lace on Jae-chan's robe as color references, he is able to convince the judges and establish his credibility. He also adds that he has already prepared his resignation letter so that he can testify in the trial. Lawyer Ko gives up the case and tells Yoo-beom to create his own statements for himself, knowing that they will be defeated in the next and last trial. The prosecution quickly requests a travel ban on Yoo-beom. Devastated, Yoo-beom rebukes Inspector Choi and deliberately rams his car into him in front of Jae-chan. As Yoo-beom is taken away by the police, the dying inspector reveals to the mourning Jae-chan that he also had the ability to see the future through dreams and that he had foreseen his death by Yoo-beom in a dream when he was still a policeman. Jae-chan expresses his respect and thanks to him, apologizing to him for not being able to recognize him when they first met at the prosecution office, for compelling him to work too hard on investigations, and for making him worry when he acted foolishly. Inspector Choi says his last words to Jae-chan before he finally dies. After Inspector Choi's funeral, Yoo-beom finally admits his crimes and is sentenced to life imprisonment. Days after Yoo-beom's trial, Hong-joo and Jae-chan go to Woo-tak's to provide him books so that Woo-tak can study law and become a lawyer, now that he is unemployed. A year later, pianist and Seung-won's girlfriend Park So-yoon returns to Korea. Together with Hong-joo, Jae-chan, and their friends and colleagues, she attends the wedding party of senior prosecutors Ji-kwang and Son Woo-joo, who had been dating, unknown to their co-workers in the prosecution office. Hong-Joo catches the wedding bouquet thrown by the bride. In the closing scene of the series, Jae-chan reveals to Hong-joo one of his choices that he never regretted: his choice of meeting up with Hong-joo whom he had been looking for since they last met thirteen years ago.

== Production ==
- This is the second collaboration between singer-actress Bae Suzy and scriptwriter Park Hye-ryun after working together in the 2011 hit series Dream High. It is also the third time that Park and Lee Jong-suk have worked together after I Can Hear Your Voice and Pinocchio.
- First script reading took place on January 20, 2017, in Mokdong, Seoul, South Korea.
- While You Were Sleeping is a fully pre-produced TV series. Filming began in February 2017, while Lee Jong-suk joined filming on March 2. Filming wrapped up on July 27 at Wonbang set in Paju, after five months of filming.
- This was the second drama where Shin Jae-ha and Kim So-hyun appeared together, after KBS's 3-episode Page Turner.

== Original soundtrack ==
While You Were Sleeping OST

Soundtrack album by Various artists
- Released: November 16, 2017
- Genre: Soundtrack
- Length: 68:20
- Languages: Korean, English
- Labels: iHQ; Gazi Contents; LOEN

=== Part 1 ===
No.	Title	Lyrics	Music	Artist	Length
1.	"When Night Falls" (긴 밤이 오면)	yoda	Kim Se-jin; Midnight	Eddy Kim	03:48
2.	"When Night Falls" (Inst.)		Kim Se-jin; Midnight		03:48
Total length:					07:36

=== Part 2 ===
No.	Title	Lyrics	Music	Artist	Length
1.	"It's You"	Kim Ji-soo; Mike Woods; Kevin White; Andrew Bazzi	Kim Ji-soo; Henry; Mike Woods; Kevin White; Andrew Bazzi	Henry	03:51
2.	"It's You" (Inst.)		Kim Ji-soo; Henry; Mike Woods; Kevin White; Andrew Bazzi		03:51
Total length:					07:42

=== Part 3 ===
No.	Title	Lyrics	Music	Artist	Length
1.	"You Belong to My World" (좋겠다)	Emotion is; Seo Jae-ha; Kim Young-sung	Emotion is; Seo Jae-ha; Kim Young-sung	Roy Kim	03:38
2.	"You Belong to My World" (Inst.)		Emotion is; Seo Jae-ha; Kim Young-sung		03:38
Total length:					07:16

=== Part 4 ===
No.	Title	Lyrics	Music	Artist	Length
1.	"I Love You Boy"	Kim Ji-soo; JK	Kim Ji-soo	Suzy	04:30
2.	"I Love You Boy" (Inst.)		Kim Ji-soo		04:30
Total length:					09:00

=== Part 5 ===
No.	Title	Lyrics	Music	Artists	Length
1.	"While You Were Sleeping" (당신이 잠든 사이에)	Park Se-joon; Choi Sang-yeob	Park Se-joon; Choi Sang-yeob	Brother Su; SE O	03:22
2.	"Your World" (너의 세상)	Park Se-joon; SE O	Park Se-joon; Kim Min-ji	SE O	03:37
3.	"While You Were Sleeping" (Inst.)		Park Se-joon; Choi Sang-yeob		03:22
4.	"Your World" (Inst.)		Park Se-joon; Kim Min-ji		03:37
Total length:					13:58

=== Part 6 ===
No.	Title	Lyrics	Music	Artists	Length
1.	"Lucid Dream" (자각몽)	Kevin; Riwon; JK	Kevin	Monogram	03:41
2.	"Lucid Dream" (Inst.)		Kevin		03:41
Total length:					07:22

=== Part 7 ===
No.	Title	Lyrics	Music	Artists	Length
1.	"I Miss You Today Too" (오늘도 그리워 그리워)	Ji Hoon	Rocoberry	Davichi	03:22
2.	"I Miss You Today Too" (Inst.)		Rocoberry		03:22
Total length:					06:44

=== Part 8 ===
No.	Title	Lyrics	Music	Artists	Length
1.	"Maze" (미로)	Kamdongis; Seo Jae-ha; Kim Young-seong; Song Chan-ran	Kamdongis; Seo Jae-ha; Kim Young-seong; Song Chan-ran	Kim Na-young	03:31
2.	"Maze" (Inst.)		Kamdongis; Seo Jae-ha; Kim Young-seong; Song Chan-ran		03:31
Total length:					07:02

=== Part 9 ===
No.	Title	Lyrics	Music	Artists	Length
1.	"Come To Me" (내게 와)	Lee Ha-jin; Baek Mu-hyun; Kang Dae-ho	Baek Mu-hyun; Kang Dae-ho	Lee Jong-suk	03:21
2.	"Come To Me" (Inst.)		Baek Mu-hyun; Kang Dae-ho		03:21
Total length:					07:42

=== Part 10 ===
No.	Title	Lyrics	Music	Artists	Length
1.	"IF"	Jung Joon-il	Jung Joon-il	Jung Joon-il	03:46
2.	"IF" (Inst.)		Jung Joon-il		03:46
Total length:					07:32

=== Part 11 ===
No.	Title	Lyrics	Music	Artists	Length
1.	"I'll Tell It" (말할게)	Soundhood; JK; Baek Ji-woong	Soundhood; Baek Ji-woong	Jang Da-bin	03:59
2.	"I'll Tell It" (Inst.)		Soundhood; Baek Ji-woong		03:59
Total length:					07:58

=== Part 12 ===
No.	Title	Lyrics	Music	Artists	Length
1.	"Would You Know" (그대는 알까요)	Lee Ha-jin	Pastel Lounge	Lee Jong-suk	03:19
2.	"Would You Know" (Inst.)		Pastel Lounge		03:19
Total length:					06:38

=== Part 13 ===
No.	Title	Lyrics	Music	Artists	Length
1.	"Words I Want To Hear" (듣고 싶은 말)	Jihoon	Conan (Rocoberry); Roco; Lee Yoo-jin	Suzy	03:27
2.	"Words I Want To Hear" (Inst.)		Conan (Rocoberry); Roco; Lee Yoo-jin		03:27
Total length:					06:54

CD 2
No.	Title	Artists	Length
1.	"Traveler"	Various Artists	01:46
2.	"Cat Walk"	Various Artists	01:01
3.	"Stupid"	Various Artists	01:31
4.	"Touch Me In My Dream"	Various Artists	03:21
5.	"When The Nightmares Started"	Various Artists	03:11
6.	"Awesome Cute"	Various Artists	01:56
7.	"Rememberable"	Various Artists	02:26
8.	"Spirit of Fire"	Various Artists	01:56

=== Charted songs ===
Chart performance

Title	Year	Peak chart positions	Sales	Remarks
Title	Year	KOR Gaon	Sales	Remarks
"When Night Falls" (Eddy Kim)	2017	34	KOR: 93,842	Part 1
"It's You" (Henry)	2017	54	KOR: 45,899	Part 2
"You Belong to My World" (Roy Kim)	2017	20	KOR: 122,498	Part 3
"I Love You Boy" (Suzy)	2017	13	KOR: 135,855	Part 4
"I Miss You Today Too" (Davichi)	2017	20	KOR: 118,445	Part 7
"Maze" (Kim Na-young)	2017	31	KOR: 58,717	Part 8
"IF" (Jung Joon-il)	2017	33	KOR: 27,584	Part 10
"Words I Want To Hear" (Suzy)	2017	30	KOR: 65,806+	Part 13

== Ratings ==
- In the table below, the blue numbers represent the lowest ratings and the red numbers represent the highest ratings.
- NR denotes that the drama did not rank in the top 20 daily programs on that date
While You Were Sleeping : South Korea viewers per episode (millions)

Season	Episode number																Average
Season	1	2	3	4	5	6	7	8	9	10	11	12	13	14	15	16	Average
1	1.792	1.868	1.441	2.049	2.025	1.990	1.971	1.845	1.823	1.994	1.707	1.944	1.831	2.058	2.049	1.953	1.896

Source: Audience measurement performed nationwide by Nielsen Media Research.

Ep.	Broadcast date	Title (Note: Each of the episode titles is excerpted from films.)	Average audience share			
Ep.	Broadcast date	Title	TNmS		AGB Nielsen	
Ep.	Broadcast date	Title	Nationwide	Seoul	Nationwide	Seoul
1	September 27, 2017	While You Were Sleeping (Note: While You Were Sleeping) (당신이 잠든 사이에)	8.2% (16th)	9.1% (9th)	7.2% (19th)	8.1% (12th)
2	September 27, 2017	While You Were Sleeping (당신이 잠든 사이에)	9.4% (14th)	10.8% (8th)	9.2% (10th)	10.4% (6th)
3	September 28, 2017	The Good, The Bad, and The Weird (Note: The Good, the Bad, the Weird) (좋은놈 나쁜놈 이상한놈)	8.0% (17th)	8.7% (11th)	8.3% (16th)	9.8% (10th)
4	September 28, 2017	The Good, The Bad, and The Weird (좋은놈 나쁜놈 이상한놈)	9.3% (10th)	10.2% (9th)	9.2% (12th)	11.0% (8th)
5	October 4, 2017	Secretly, Greatly (Note: Secretly, Greatly) (은밀하게 위대하게)	5.0% (NR)	5.2% (18th)	5.1% (NR)	5.6% (17th)
6	October 4, 2017	Secretly, Greatly (은밀하게 위대하게)	5.5% (19th)	5.7% (14th)	6.1% (11th)	7.0% (7th)
7	October 5, 2017	A Few Good Men (Note: A Few Good Men) (어 퓨 굿 맨)	8.3% (13th)	8.2% (11th)	7.9% (14th)	8.2% (10th)
8	October 5, 2017	A Few Good Men (어 퓨 굿 맨)	9.6% (7th)	9.9% (3rd)	8.9% (9th)	9.6% (6th)
9	October 11, 2017	Don't Trust Her (Note: Too Beautiful to Lie) (그녀를 믿지 마세요)	7.8% (17th)	9.3% (10th)	8.1% (13th)	10.0% (7th)
10	October 11, 2017	Don't Trust Her (그녀를 믿지 마세요)	8.9% (15th)	10.2% (8th)	9.4% (8th)	11.5% (5th)
11	October 12, 2017	City of the Blind (Note: Blindness) (눈먼자들의 도시)	7.5% (18th)	7.8% (13th)	8.9% (12th)	10.3% (8th)
12	October 12, 2017	City of the Blind (눈먼자들의 도시)	8.5% (12th)	8.9% (8th)	9.7% (10th)	12.1% (6th)
13	October 18, 2017	A Secret That Can't Be Told (Note: Secret) (말할수 없는 비밀)	7.6% (18th)	8.5% (8th)	8.6% (8th)	9.5% (6th)
14	October 18, 2017	A Secret That Can't Be Told (말할수 없는 비밀)	9.1% (10th)	11.4% (6th)	10.0% (5th)	11.3% (4th)
15	October 19, 2017	Pride and Prejudice (Note: Pride and Prejudice) (오만과 편견)	7.1% (NR)	7.7% (18th)	7.9% (16th)	8.9% (10th)
16	October 19, 2017	Pride and Prejudice (오만과 편견)	8.0% (18th)	8.9% (11th)	8.9% (11th)	10.0% (8th)
17	October 25, 2017	The Usual Suspect (Note: The Usual Suspects) (유주얼 서스펙트)	7.7% (15th)	8.1% (12th)	7.3% (16th)	8.0% (10th)
18	October 25, 2017	The Usual Suspect (유주얼 서스펙트)	8.8% (12th)	9.7% (8th)	8.9% (7th)	10.0% (4th)
19	October 26, 2017	Boy Meets Girl (Note: Boy Meets Girl) (소년, 소녀 만나다)	6.5% (NR)	7.0% (15th)	8.2% (12th)	9.6% (8th)
20	October 26, 2017	Boy Meets Girl (소년, 소녀 만나다)	7.4% (18th)	8.7% (8th)	8.9% (8th)	10.3% (6th)
21	November 1, 2017	To Die or to be Bad (Note: Die Bad) (죽거나 혹은 나쁘거나)	6.5% (16th)	7.6% (11th)	6.9% (13th)	7.9% (9th)
22	November 1, 2017	To Die or to be Bad (죽거나 혹은 나쁘거나)	7.6% (11th)	8.9% (6th)	8.4% (7th)	9.7% (5th)
23	November 2, 2017	Knocking on Heaven's Door (Note: Knockin' on Heaven's Door) (노킹온 헤븐스 도어)	7.0% (18th)	7.1% (16th)	7.3% (17th)	8.3% (13th)
24	November 2, 2017	Knocking on Heaven's Door (노킹온 헤븐스 도어)	8.2% (14th)	9.0% (7th)	8.6% (9th)	9.9% (7th)
25	November 8, 2017	We're on Our Way To Meet You Now (Note: Be with You) (지금 만나러 갑니다)	5.7% (NR)	7.2% (18th)	6.8% (17th)	8.2% (9th)
26	November 8, 2017	We're on Our Way To Meet You Now (지금 만나러 갑니다)	6.8% (19th)	8.4% (11th)	8.6% (7th)	10.0% (6th)
27	November 9, 2017	Catch Me If You Can (Note: Catch Me If You Can) (캐치미 이프유캔)	7.7% (18th)	9.3% (9th)	7.7% (12th)	8.9% (9th)
28	November 9, 2017	Catch Me If You Can (캐치미 이프유캔)	8.7% (14th)	10.1% (7th)	9.6% (8th)	11.3% (5th)
29	November 15, 2017	Stand By Me (Note: Stand by Me) (스탠 바이 미)	7.2% (16th)	8.1% (9th)	8.1% (8th)	9.3% (6th)
30	November 15, 2017	Stand By Me (스탠 바이 미)	8.7% (10th)	10.0% (6th)	9.6% (7th)	11.0% (5th)
31	November 16, 2017	Goodbye, My Friend (Note: The Cure) (굿 바이 마이 프랜드)	7.6% (16th)	8.6% (10th)	8.7% (11th)	10.0% (7th)
32	November 16, 2017	Goodbye, My Friend (굿 바이 마이 프랜드)	8.7% (13th)	9.5% (6th)	9.7% (7th)	11.0% (5th)
Average			7.7%	8.7%	8.3%	9.6%

== Awards and nominations ==
Year	Award	Category	Recipient	Result	Ref.
2017	19th Mnet Asian Music Awards	Best OST	Bae Suzy – "I Love You Boy"	Nominated	
2017	25th SBS Drama Awards	Top Excellence Award, Actor in a Wednesday–Thursday Drama	Lee Jong-suk	Won	
2017	25th SBS Drama Awards	Top Excellence Award, Actress in a Wednesday–Thursday Drama	Bae Suzy	Won	
2017	25th SBS Drama Awards	Character of the Year	Lee Sang-yeob	Nominated	
2017	25th SBS Drama Awards	Excellence Award, Actor in a Wednesday–Thursday Drama	Lee Sang-yeob	Won	
2017	25th SBS Drama Awards	Excellence Award, Actor in a Wednesday–Thursday Drama	Jung Hae-in	Nominated	
2017	25th SBS Drama Awards	Excellence Award, Actress in a Wednesday–Thursday Drama	Ko Sung-hee	Nominated	
2017	25th SBS Drama Awards	Best Supporting Actor	Kim Won-hae	Won	
2017	25th SBS Drama Awards	Best Supporting Actress	Hwang Young-hee	Nominated	
2017	25th SBS Drama Awards	Youth Acting Award	Nam Da-reum	Nominated	
2017	25th SBS Drama Awards	Youth Acting Award	Shin Yi-joon	Nominated	
2017	25th SBS Drama Awards	Best Couple	Lee Jong-suk & Bae Suzy	Won	
2018	Korea First Brand Awards	Drama Category	While You Were Sleeping	Won	
2018	54th Baeksang Arts Awards	Most Popular Actress	Bae Suzy	Won	
2018	13th Seoul International Drama Awards	Top Excellence Award for Korean Drama	While You Were Sleeping	Won	
2018	13th Seoul International Drama Awards	Outstanding Korean Actor	Lee Jong-suk	Nominated	
2018	13th Seoul International Drama Awards	Outstanding Korean Actress	Bae Suzy	Nominated	
2018	6th APAN Star Awards	Top Excellence Award, Actor in a Miniseries	Lee Jong-suk	Nominated	
2018	6th APAN Star Awards	Excellence Award, Actress in a Miniseries	Bae Suzy	Nominated	
2018	6th APAN Star Awards	K-Star Award, Actor	Lee Jong-suk	Nominated	
2018	6th APAN Star Awards	K-Star Award, Actress	Bae Suzy	Nominated	
