= Cha Jung-won =

South Korean actress and model

- 차정원
- Born: Cha Mi-young; October 18, 1989 (age 36); Busan, South Korea
- Occupations: Actress; model
- Years active: 2014–present
- Agent: SARAM Entertainment

Korean name
- Hangul: 차미영
- RR: Cha Miyeong
- MR: Ch'a Miyŏng

Stage name
- Hangul: 차정원
- RR: Cha Jeongwon
- MR: Ch'a Chŏngwŏn

Cha Jung-won (Korean: 차정원; born October 18, 1989), birth name Cha Mi-young (차미영), is a South Korean actress and model. She landed her lead role in Wednesday 3:30 PM (2017) and Lawless Lawyer (2018).

== Career ==
=== 2012: Debut ===
Cha Jung-won made her acting debut in the film titled Horror Stories in 2012.

She landed her second role in the web drama, Loss:Time:Love and made a cameo appearance in All About My Mom. Her first supporting role came soon after, playing as Jung Seon-min in She Was Pretty in 2015.

=== 2016-present: Breakthrough with lead roles ===
Jung-won landed her first lead role in the SBS drama, Kidnapping Assemblyman Mr. Clean in 2016, and Wednesday 3:30 PM in 2017. She had a cameo in While You Were Sleeping. She also played the lead role in Oh! Dear Half-Basement Goddesses, and supporting roles in Lawless Lawyer and My Absolute Boyfriend both in 2018.

On November 8, 2022, Cha signed an exclusive contract with Saram Entertainment.

== Filmography ==
=== Film ===
Year	Title	Role	Notes	Ref.
2012	Horror Stories	Minju	Cameo	

=== Television series ===
Year	Title	Role	Notes	Ref.
2015	Loss:Time:Life	Park Min-ji	Web drama	
2015	All About My Mom	Eunha	Cameo	
2015	She Was Pretty	Jung Seon-min	Supporting role	
2016	The Master of Revenge	Chun Ja	Cameo	
2016	Kidnapping Assemblyman Mr. Clean	Detective Park	Lead role	
2017	Wednesday 3:30 PM	Gong Na-yeon	Lead role	
2017	While You Were Sleeping	Yoo Soo-kyung	Cameo	
2017	Oh! Dear Half-Basement Goddesses	Pyo Eun	Lead role	
2018	Lawless Lawyer	Kang Yeon-hee	Supporting role	
2019	My Absolute Boyfriend	Bae Kyu-ri	Supporting role	

== Other notes ==
- She has a white Bichon Frise, and the dog's name is Rosie.
- She is famous for her fashion and beauty sense. She spent three seasons on the fashion and beauty program as MC.
