= Wednesday 3:30 PM =

2017 South Korean mini television series

- Promotional Poster
- Hangul: 수요일 오후3시30분
- RR: Suyoil ohu3si30bun
- MR: Suyoil ohu3si30pun
- Genre: Romance; Comedy
- Written by: Lee Seo-eun
- Directed by: Lee Jung-hoon
- Creative director: Joo Sang-kyoo
- Starring: Lee Hong-bin; Jin Ki-joo; Ahn Bo-hyun; Cha Jung-won
- Composer: MOJI
- Country of origin: South Korea
- Original language: Korean
- No. of episodes: 15 (Oksusu); 10 (SBS Plus)

Production
- Executive producer: Kim Yong-jin
- Producer: Park Sun-young
- Editors: Kim Jung-min; Cha Myung-ji
- Camera setup: Single camera
- Running time: 15 mins (Oksusu); 30 mins (SBS Plus)
- Production company: SBS Plus

Original release
- Network: Oksusu
- Release: 31 May – 14 June 2017
- Network: SBS
- Release: 7 June – 21 June 2017

Wednesday 3:30 PM (Korean: 수요일 오후3시30분; RR: Suyoil ohu3si30bun) is a South Korean mini television series starring Lee Hong-bin, Jin Ki-joo, Ahn Bo-hyun and Cha Jung-won. The drama first aired on Oksusu, a mobile app, on May 31, 2017. It first aired on Oksusu, then aired on SBS Plus every Wednesday at 15:30 (KST) starting from June 7, 2017.

== Synopsis ==
Story about a girl called Sun Eun-woo (Jin Ki-joo) who was dumped by her boyfriend and tries win him back by making him jealous. She manipulates her social media to create a fake "lovestagram" (love + Instagram) with her childhood friend Yoon Jae-won (Lee Hong-bin).

== Cast ==
=== Main ===
- Lee Hong-bin as Yoon Jae-won
- Jin Ki-joo as Sun Eun-woo
- Ahn Bo-hyun as Baek Seung-kyu
- Cha Jung-won as Gong Na-yeon

=== Others ===
- Kim Hye-ji as Kim Hye-won
- Lim Too-cheol as Yang Tae-kyung
- Cho Seung-hee as Choi Sun-ah
- Ha-eun as Ha-eun
- Yang Jung-yoon as Ji-yul
- Song Da-eun as Da-eun
- Baek Bo-ram as Seung-kyu's new girlfriend

== Production ==
The first script reading took place in March 2017.

== Original soundtracks ==
Wednesday 3:30 PM Original Soundtrack

Soundtrack album by Various Artists
- Released: June 9, 2017
- Genre: Soundtrack
- Language: Korean
- Label: RIAK Inc.
- Producer: Dong Min-ho

=== Tracks ===
No.	Title	Artists	Length
1.	"I Just Want To"	An Ye-seul	04:21
2.	"Spring (여기 봄)"	Jin Ki-joo	02:33
3.	"View (Album Ver.)"	Juk-jae	04:42
4.	"Let's Go To the Stars (별보러 가자)"	Juk-jae	05:17
5.	"I Just Want To (Inst.)"	An Ye-seul	04:21
6.	"Spring (Inst.) (여기 봄 (Inst.))"	Jin Ki-joo	02:33
