= Witch's Love =

South Korean television series

- Promotional poster
- Hangul: 마녀의 사랑
- RR: Manyeoui sarang
- MR: Manyŏŭi sarang
- Genre: Romantic comedy; Mystery; Fantasy
- Written by: Son Eun-hye
- Directed by: Park Chan-yool
- Starring: Yoon So-hee; Hyun Woo; Lee Hong-bin; Kim Young-ok; Go Soo-hee
- Country of origin: South Korea
- Original language: Korean
- No. of episodes: 12

Production
- Executive producer: Sohn Ki-won
- Camera setup: Single-camera
- Running time: 60 minutes
- Production company: Kim Jong-hak Production

Original release
- Network: MBN
- Release: July 25 – August 30, 2018

Witch's Love (Korean: 마녀의 사랑) is a 2018 South Korean television series starring Yoon So-hee, Hyun Woo, Lee Hong-bin, Kim Young-ok, and Go Soo-hee. It aired on MBN from July 25 to August 30, 2018, every Wednesday and Thursday at 23:00 (KST).

== Synopsis ==
The series tells the stories of modern-day witches as they explore romance.

Kang Cho-hong is an innocent witch who lives with her two grandmothers who own a rice soup restaurant. Ma Sung-tae is a businessman who has had childhood trauma. He wants to find who was responsible for it and where he had his accident. He meets Cho-hong and this will change their lives forever.

== Cast ==
=== Main ===
- Yoon So-hee as Kang Cho-hong

A nosy witch who works as a delivery person in a restaurant run by two other witches. She possesses the power of telekinesis.

- Hyun Woo as Ma Sung-tae

A wealthy business man who is also a martial arts expert with childhood trauma.

- Lee Hong-bin as Hwang Jae-wook

A webtoon illustrator.

- Kim Young-ok as Maeng Ye-soon

A witch who is an artisan of rice soup.

- Go Soo-hee as Jo Aeng-doo

A witch who possesses super-human strength.

=== Supporting ===
- Choi Jae-sub as Kim Dong-soo

Sung-tae's secretary.

- Choi Tae-hwan as Choi Min-soo

Cho-hong's ex-boyfriend.

- Lee Do-yeop
