= Lee Hong-bin =

South Korean singer, rapper, actor and presenter (born 1993)

- 이홍빈
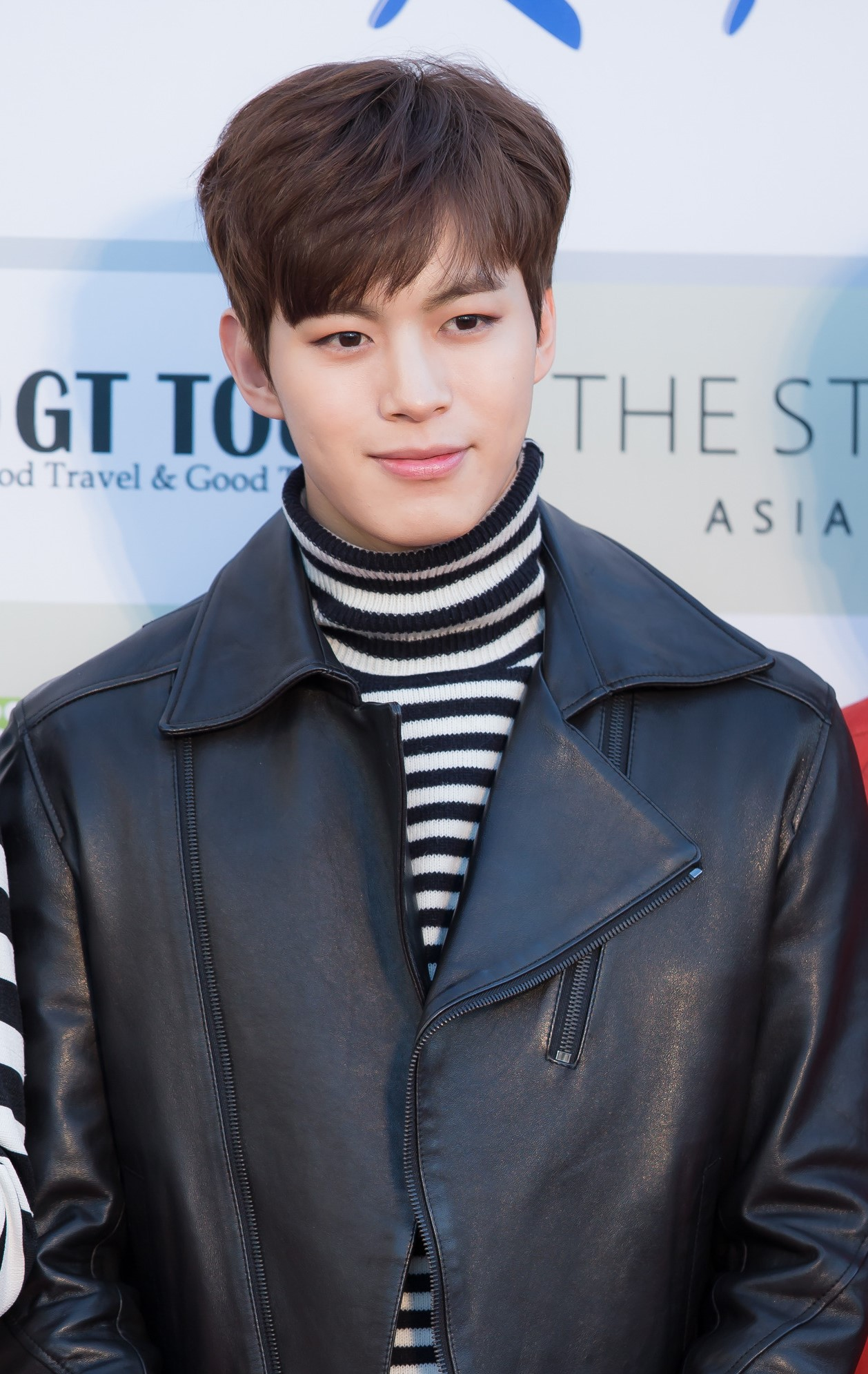
- Hongbin in 2016
- Born: Lee Hong-bin; September 29, 1993 (age 33); Seoul, South Korea
- Education: Dong-ah Broadcasting College
- Occupations: Online streamer; singer; rapper; actor; presenter
- Musical career
- Genres: K-pop; dance; hip hop
- Instruments: Vocals; guitar
- Years active: 2012–2020
- Label: Jellyfish
- Formerly of: VIXX

Korean name
- Hangul: 이홍빈
- RR: I Hongbin
- MR: I Hongbin

Lee Hong-bin (Korean: 이홍빈; born September 29, 1993), also known by the mononym Hongbin, is a South Korean CHZZK streamer, former singer, rapper, actor and presenter formerly signed under Jellyfish Entertainment. He debuted as a member of the South Korean boy group VIXX in May 2012, and began his acting career in 2014 in SBS' romantic drama Glorious Day as Yoo Ji-ho. He has since had a leading role in KBS2's fantasy action-romance Moorim School: Saga of the Brave (2016) as Wang Chi-ang. In 2017, Hongbin played Yoon Jae-won in the SBS Plus rom-com mini-drama Wednesday 3:30 PM. He officially left VIXX in August 2020.

== Early life ==
Hongbin was born and raised in Jayang-dong, Seoul, South Korea. His family consists of himself, his parents and two older sisters. Hongbin studied Musical major at Dong-ah Broadcasting College. He stayed at a Buddhist temple with his grandmother when he was a child before returning to his parents in Jayang-dong.

== Career ==
=== 2012-2014: Debut with VIXX and acting debut ===
Hongbin was one of ten trainees who were contestants in Mnet's survival reality show MyDOL and was chosen to be a part of the final line-up and the six-member boy group finally debuted with "Super Hero" on May 24, 2012, on M! Countdown. During MyDOL; Hongbin was featured in Brian Joo's "Let This Die" and Seo In-guk's "Tease Me" music video.

In 2014, Hongbin was cast in the SBS week drama Glorious Day.

=== 2015–2018: MC-ing and acting career continues ===
On March 3, 2015, Hongbin joined T-ara's Jiyeon and Super Junior-M's Zhou Mi as MC on SBS MTV's The Show from March 3, 2015, to October 13, 2015. In September 2015, Hongbin was cast in his first lead role as Wang Chi-ang in KBS2's action-romance drama Moorim School: Saga of the Brave.

In September 2016, Hongbin was cast alongside fellow VIXX member N and AOA's Chanmi in the web drama What's Up With These Kids? which was aired on Naver TV Cast on November 16.

In March 2017, Hongbin was cast in a rom-com mini drama Wednesday 3:30 PM on SBS Plus.

In 2018, Hongbin was cast as a high school student who was born with hearing impairment in KBS's 10-episode drama Shining Sounds, which was broadcast on National Disabled Persons Day. The same year, he was cast in the romantic comedy drama Witch's Love, and mystery thriller The Smile Has Left Your Eyes.

=== 2019–present: Music career, variety shows, departure from VIXX, streaming career ===
On July 10, 2019, Hongbin and Monsta X's Hyungwon released a collaboration song titled "Cool Love".

On August 4, 2019, Hongbin was announced to be one of the cast members on the Mnet reality show Love Catcher 2.

In March 2020, Hongbin was criticized by netizens and news outlets for his behavior during a Twitch stream, in which he reportedly made negative comments about other idol groups while he was drunk. Hongbin issued an apology the same day, and in May, Jellyfish announced that Hongbin would be taking a hiatus from entertainment activities. On August 6, Hongbin announced his plans to return to Twitch streaming, and on August 7, Jellyfish Entertainment announced that Hongbin decided to depart from VIXX. He began his mandatory military service on August 18.

Upon his return from the military, Hongbin now streams on Twitch full time. And Since Twitch has withdrawn the South Korean Market in February 2024, he started to stream on CHZZK powered by Naver.

Besides his streaming channels, he has created another YouTube channel to re-upload all his streams from 2022 until now.

== Personal life ==
Hongbin enlisted in the military in August 2020 and was discharged on February 25, 2022, without returning to active duty in accordance with the Ministry of Defense's COVID-19 Regulations.

== Filmography ==
=== Movies ===
Year	Title	Role	Notes	Ref.
2018	Shining Sounds	Joo Hyun-sung		

=== Television series ===
Year	Title	Role	Notes	Ref.
2013	The Heirs	Himself	Cameo with VIXX members (Episode 4)	
2014	Glorious Day	Yoo Ji-ho		
2015	The Family is Coming	Lee Hong-bin	Cameo (Episode 18)	
2016	Moorim School: Saga of the Brave	Wang Chi-ang		
2016	What's Up With These Kids?	Jin Si-hwan	Web series	
2017	Wednesday 3:30 PM	Yoon Jae-won		
2018	Witch's Love	Hwang Jae-wook		
2018	The Smile Has Left Your Eyes	No Hee-joon		

=== Variety show ===
Year	Title	Notes	Ref.
2015	The Show	Co-host with Zhou Mi (Super Junior-M) and Jiyeon (T-ara)	
2015	Let's Go! Dream Team Season 2	Contestant, with Leo Ep 302	
2016	Celebrity Bromance	Cast member, with Gongchan	
2017	Law of the Jungle in Komodo	Cast member	
2018	Battle Trip	Contestant with N (Episode 91–93)	
2019	Love Catcher 2	Cast member	

== Discography ==
Year	Title	Peak chart position	Sales	Album
2019	"Make a Dream"	—	—	Legal High OST Part 6
2019	"Cool Love" (with Monsta X's Hyungwon)	—	—	Non-album single
"—" denotes releases that did not chart in that region.

== See also ==
- VIXX discography
- List of awards and nominations received by VIXX
