= Z.Hera =

South Korean singer and actress (born 1996)

- 지헤라
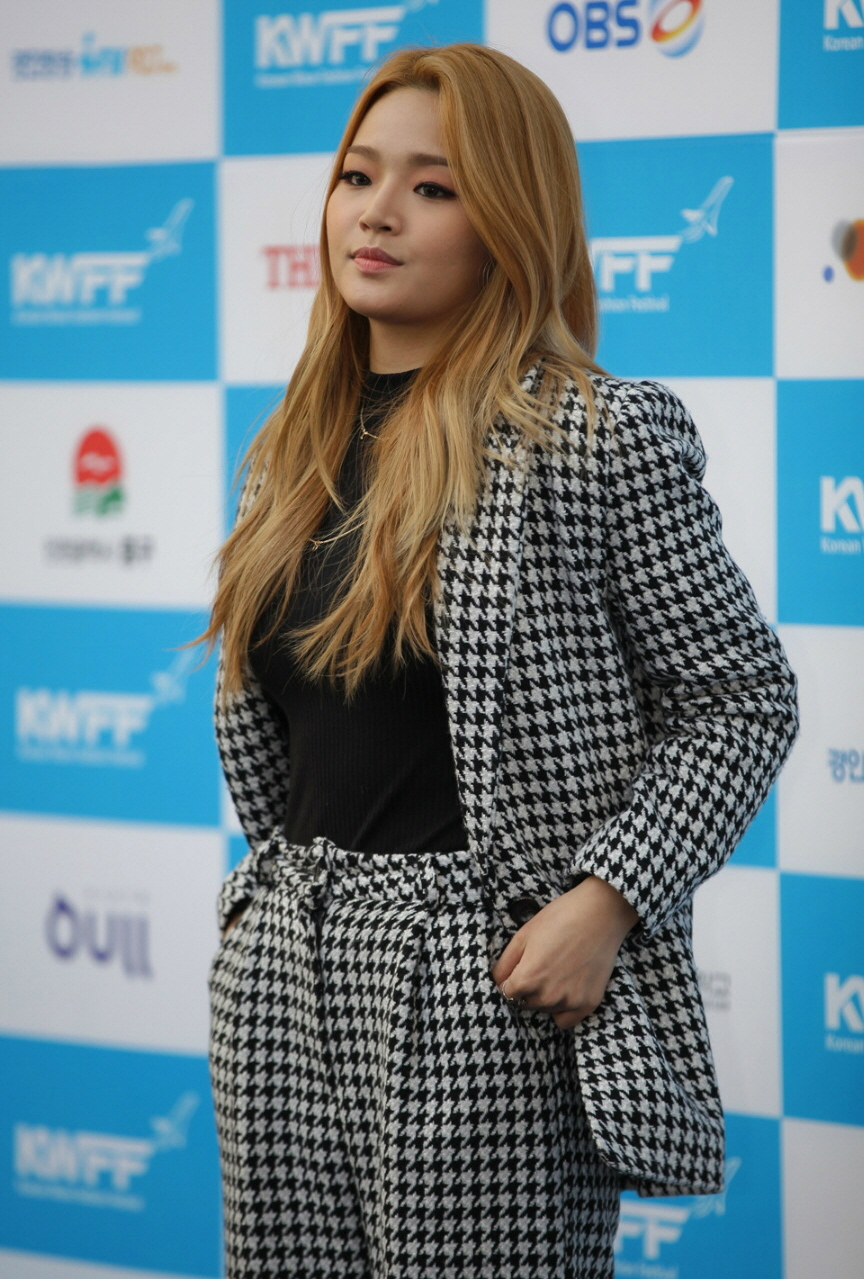
- Z.Hera in 2015
- Born: Ji Hye-ran; January 3, 1996 (age 30); Seoul, South Korea
- Occupations: Singer; actress
- Agent: Ace Factory
- Musical career
- Genres: K-pop
- Instrument: Vocals
- Years active: 2013–present
- Label: Artisans Music

Korean name
- Hangul: 지혜란
- RR: Ji Hyeran
- MR: Chi Hyeran

Stage name
- Hangul: 지헤라
- RR: Ji Hera
- MR: Chi Hera

Ji Hye-ran (Korean: 지혜란; born January 3, 1996), better known by her stage name Z.Hera, is a South Korean singer and actress. Z.Hera appeared on the documentary program Human Theater in 2006 as Shaolin Girl when she was 10 years old. She received attention after being the first South Korean singer to appear on the American social site BuzzFeed. She is known for her roles in Moorim School: Saga of the Brave (2016) and Moon Lovers: Scarlet Heart Ryeo (2016).

== Early life ==
Z.Hera learned Shaolin Kung Fu at the Shaolin Temple since she was in Elementary school. She speaks four languages: Korean, English, Mandarin and basic Japanese. She trained for 5 years to master her dance abilities with the help of Nam Hyun-joon.

== Discography ==
=== Extended plays ===
Title	Album details	Peak chart positions	Sales
Title	Album details	KOR	Sales
Z.Hera Born	Released: May 13, 2013; Label: Artisans Music; Formats: CD, digital download	84	—N/a
XOX	Released: July 9, 2015; Label: Artisans Music; Formats: CD, digital download	28	KOR: 411

=== Singles ===
Title	Year	Peak chart positions	Album
Title	Year	KOR	Album
As lead artist
"Peacock" (공작새)	2013	—	Z.Hera Born
"D island" (섬)	2014	—	Non-album single
"XOX" feat. Kaeun of Dal Shabet	2015	—	XOX
Soundtrack appearances
"Unlike Me" (나답지 않게) with Ryujin	2016	—	Moorim School: Saga of the Brave OST
"Spring" (니가 보여) with Ahn Hyo-seop	2018	—	Top Management OST
"—" denotes releases that did not chart.

== Filmography ==
=== Television series ===
Year	Title	Role	Notes
2013	Nail Shop Paris		Cameo
2016	Moorim School: Saga of the Brave	Jenny Oh	
2016	Moon Lovers: Scarlet Heart Ryeo	Park Soon-deok	
2016	Weightlifting Fairy Kim Bok-joo	Song Shi-eon	Cameo
2017	Fight for My Way	Sonya	Special appearance (Ep. 6 and 8)
2017	School 2017	Yoo Bit-na	
2017	Hello, My Twenties! 2	House owner	Cameo (Ep. 10)
2018	Something in the Rain	Ga-yeong	Cameo (Ep. 1)

=== Web series ===
Year	Title	Role
2017	Ruby Ruby Love	Yoo Bi-joo
2018	Top Management	Song Haena
2019	Love Alarm	Kim Jang-go

=== Reality show ===
Year	Title	Role	Notes
2006	Human Theater	Shaolin Girl	Documentary

=== Music videos ===
Title	Album
"Peacock" (Korean Version)	Z.Hera Born
"Peacock" (English Version)	Z.Hera Born
"D Island"	Non-album single
"XOX"	XOX
