= Winner discography =

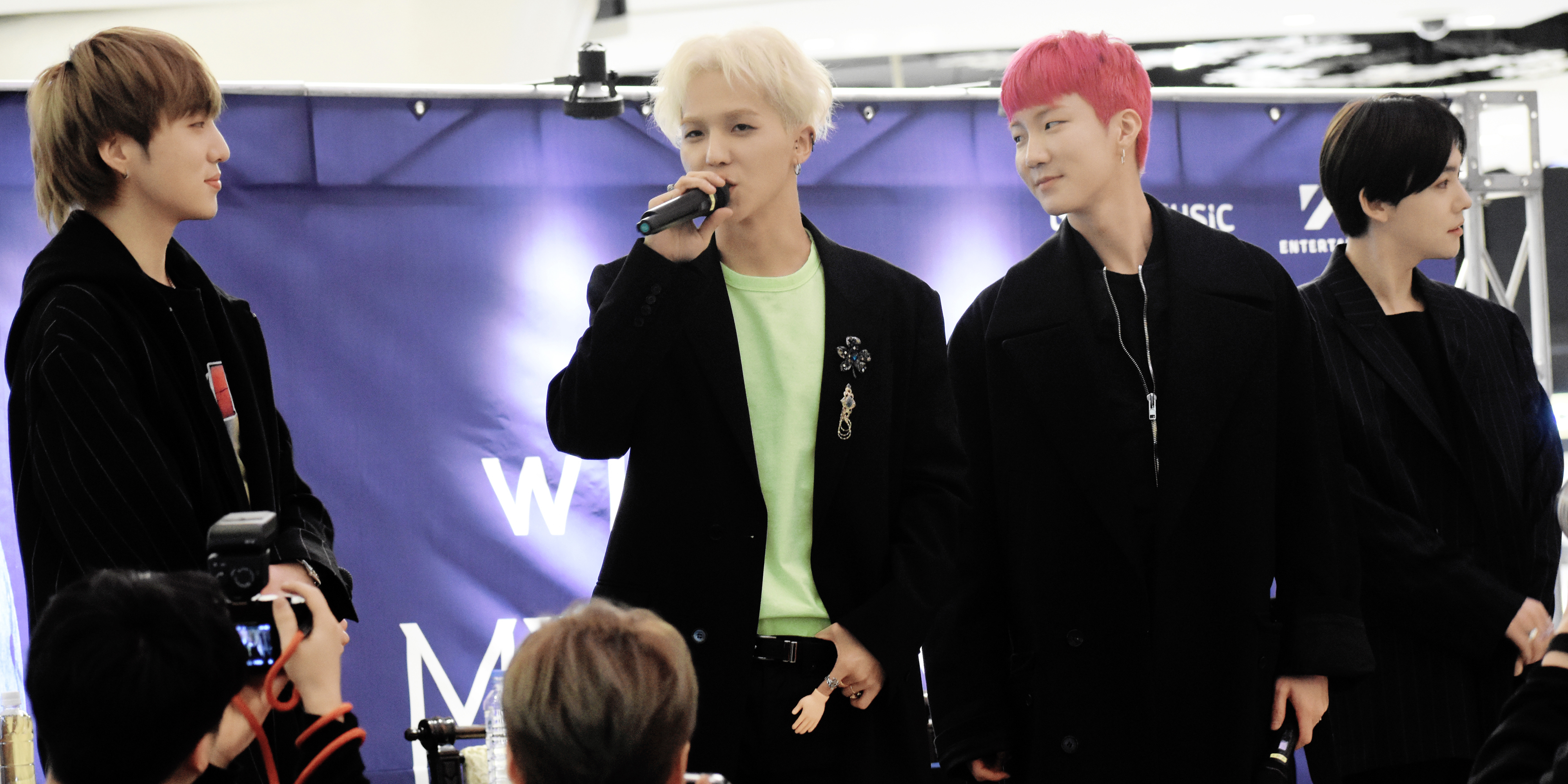
- Studio albums: 4
- EPs: 4
- Live albums: 1
- Compilation albums: 1
- Singles: 16
- Video albums: 6
- Music videos: 14
- Single albums: 3

The discography of the South Korean boy group Winner consists of four studio albums, four extended plays, three single albums, and twelve singles.

== Albums ==
=== Studio albums ===
List of studio albums, with selected details and chart positions
Title	Album details	Peak chart positions					Sales
Title	Album details	KOR	JPN	JPN Hot	US Heat	US World	Sales
2014 S/S	Released: August 12, 2014; Label: YG Entertainment, YGEX; Formats: CD, digital download	1	2	*	6	1	KOR: 92,897; JPN: 40,835; US: 1,000
Our Twenty For	Released: February 7, 2018; Label: YGEX; Formats: CD, digital download	—	5	6	—	—	JPN: 18,035 (Note: Japan album sales for Our Twenty For as of March 2018.)
Everyday	Released: April 4, 2018; Label: YG Entertainment, YGEX; Formats: CD, digital download	1	5	4	—	6	KOR: 124,264; JPN: 36,991 (Note: Japan sales figures for EVERD4Y.)
Remember	Released: April 9, 2020; Label: YG Entertainment; Formats: CD, digital download	3	36	30	—	—	KOR: 114,466 (Note: Korean album sales as of January 2021.)
"—" denotes releases that did not chart or were not released in that region. Note: Billboard Japan's Hot Albums was first issued in June 2015.

=== Compilation albums ===
Title	Album details	Peak positions	Sales
Title	Album details	JPN	Sales
Winner The Best Song 4 U	Released: February 12, 2020; Label: YGEX; Formats: CD, digital download	11	JPN: 5,768

=== Live albums ===
Title	Album details	Peak positions	Sales
Title	Album details	KOR	Sales
2016 Winner Exit Tour In Seoul Live CD	Released: August 1, 2016; Label: YG Entertainment; Formats: CD, digital download	4	KOR: 3,705
Winner 2019 Cross Tour In Seoul	Released: May 27, 2020; Label: YG Entertainment; Formats: CD, digital download	—	—N/a

=== Single albums ===
List of single albums, with selected details and chart positions
Title	Album details	Peak positions			Sales
Title	Album details	KOR	FRA Digital	JPN	Sales
Fate Number For	Released: April 4, 2017; Label: YG Entertainment; Formats: CD, digital download	2	*	7	KOR: 66,494+; JPN: 20,196
Our Twenty For	Released: August 4, 2017; Label: YG Entertainment; Formats: CD, digital download	3	46	—	KOR: 57,990
Millions	Released: December 19, 2018; Label: YG Entertainment; Formats: CD, digital download	3	*	—	KOR: 60,892
"—" denotes releases that did not chart or were not released in that region.

== Extended plays ==
List of extended plays, with selected chart positions and sales
Title	Details	Peak chart positions							Sales
Title	Details	KOR	FRA Digital	JPN	JPN Hot	US Heat	US Indie	US World	Sales
Exit : E	Released: February 1, 2016; Label: YG Entertainment; Formats: CD, digital download	1	*	63	*	17	3	2	KOR: 87,553; JPN: 4,321
We	Released: May 15, 2019; Label: YG Entertainment, YGEX; Formats: CD, digital download	1	109	4	4	—	—	6	KOR: 129,932; JPN: 37,221 (Note: Japan sales figures for WE.)
Cross	Released: October 23, 2019; Label: YG Entertainment; Formats: CD, digital download	4	128	85	—	—	—	12	KOR: 106,537; JPN: 1,341
Holiday	Released: July 5, 2022; Label: YG Entertainment; Formats: CD, digital download	5	*	49	53	—	—	—	KOR: 203,179; JPN: 2,291
"—" denotes releases that did not chart or were not released in that region.

== Singles ==
List of singles, with selected chart positions, showing year released and album name
Title	Year	Peak chart positions			Sales	Album
Title	Year	KOR	KOR Hot	US World	Sales	Album
Pre-debut (Team A)
"Just Another Boy"	2013	41	82	—	KOR: 42,005	WIN: Final Battle
"Go Up"	2013	8	31	—	KOR: 122,125	WIN: Final Battle
Post-debut
"Empty" (공허해)	2014	1	*	4	KOR: 1,596,727	2014 S/S
"Color Ring" (컬러링)	2014	3	*	24	KOR: 571,180	2014 S/S
"Sentimental" (센치해)	2016	4	*	—	KOR: 733,350	Exit : E
"Baby Baby"	2016	6	*	—	KOR: 272,025	Exit : E
"Really Really"	2017	1	10	3	KOR: 2,500,000	Fate Number For
"Fool"	2017	6	*	4	KOR: 236,662	Fate Number For
"Love Me Love Me"	2017	5	17	4	KOR: 541,097	Our Twenty For
"Island"	2017	16	62	3	KOR: 193,114	Our Twenty For
"Everyday"	2018	2	3	10	—N/a	Everyday
"Millions"	2018	2	2	5		Millions
"Ah Yeah" (아예)	2019	5	5	9	—N/a	We
"Soso"	2019	75	—	—	—N/a	Cross
"Hold" (뜸)	2020	21	16	15	—N/a	Remember
"Remember"	2020	42	23	—	—N/a	Remember
"I Love U"	2022	24	*	—	—N/a	Holiday
"—" denotes releases that did not chart or were not released in that region. "*" denotes the chart did not exist at that time.

== Other charted songs ==
Title	Year	Peak positions		Sales	Album
Title	Year	KOR	KOR Hot	Sales	Album
"Don't Flirt" (끼부리지마)	2014	9	*	KOR: 1,031,070+	2014 S/S
"Different"	2014	17	*	KOR: 316,461+	2014 S/S
"Love Is a Lie" (척)	2014	20	*	KOR: 163,144+	2014 S/S
"But" (사랑하지마)	2014	21	*	KOR: 190,428+	2014 S/S
"Tonight" (이 밤)	2014	25	*	KOR: 147,929+	2014 S/S
"Smile Again"	2014	29	*	KOR: 131,854+	2014 S/S
"Immature" (철없어)	2016	14	*	KOR: 80,702+	Exit : E
"Air"	2018	50	26	—N/a	Everyday
"We Were" (예뻤더라)	2018	92	34	—N/a	Everyday
"Hello" (여보세요)	2018	93	35	—N/a	Everyday
"La La"	2018	99	38	—N/a	Everyday
"For"	2018	—	38	—N/a	Everyday
"Raining"	2018	—	42	—N/a	Everyday
"Zoo" (동물의 왕국)	2019	112	—	—N/a	We
"First Love" (2019) (첫사랑)	2019	113	—	—N/a	We
"Mola" (몰라도 너무 몰라)	2019	126	—	—N/a	We
"Boom"	2019	145	—	—N/a	We
"—" denotes releases that did not chart.

== Videography ==
=== Video albums ===
Title	Album details	Peak	Sales
Title	Album details	JPN	Sales
Korean
Epilogue Win's Edition DVD [The 100 Days' Journey]	Released: March 11, 2014; Labels: YG Entertainment; Format: DVD	*	—N/a
Winner TV DVD [Episode Collection]	Released: August 29, 2014; Labels: YG Entertainment; Format: DVD	*	—N/a
Japanese
Winner's Welcoming Collection DVD [Good Bye 2014 x Welcoming 2015]	Released: January 28, 2015; Labels: YGEX; Format: DVD	11	—N/a
Winner Japan Tour 2015	Released: May 25, 2016; Labels: YGEX; Format: DVD, Blu-ray	4	JPN: 6,553
2016 Winner Exit Tour in Japan	Released: December 14, 2016; Labels: YGEX; Format: DVD, Blu-ray	6	JPN: 2,267
Winner Japan Tour 2018 We'll Always Be Young	Released: September 5, 2018; Labels: YGEX; Format: DVD, Blu-ray	3	JPN: 2,503
"—" denotes releases that did not chart or were not released in that region.

=== Music videos ===
Year	Title	Director(s)	Length	Ref.
2014	"Empty"	Seo Hyun-seung	4:07	
2014	"Color Ring"	Dee Shin	4:24	
2016	"I'm Young	Dee Shin	5:40	
2016	"Sentimental"	Digipedi	3:43	
2016	"Baby Baby"	Fantazy Lab	5:05	
2017	"Really Really"	Dave Meyers	3:40	
2017	"Fool"	Jinooya Makes	3:54	
2017	"Love Me Love Me"	Oui Kim	3:42	
2017	"Island"	Jinooya Makes	3:36	
2018	"Everyday"	Dave Meyers	3:34	
2018	"Millions"	Seo Hyun-seung	3:36	
2019	"Ah Yeah"	Seo Hyun-seung	3:11	
2019	"Soso"	Kwon Yong Soo	3:55	
2020	"Hold"	HATTRICK	4:19	
2020	"Remember"	Kwon Yong Soo	4:14	
2022	"I LOVE U"	Kwon Yong Soo	3:10	

== See also ==
Individual discographies

- Song Mino
