= Half-Moon Friends =

- Official Poster
- Genre: Variety; Reality
- Developed by: JTBC
- Written by: Choi Hye-jung; Jang Mi-ok; Park Hye-ri; Yoo Na-ol; Park Byung-hee; Kim Ki-hyun; Park Ah-reum
- Directed by: Kim Soo-ah; Hong Sang-hoon; Shim Woo-jin; Jung Jong-chan; Oh Hyo-jung; Sung Se-hee; Kim Min-jung; Jeon Yoon-so
- Starring: Kim Jin-woo; Lee Seung-hoon; Song Min-ho; Kang Seung-yoon; Nam Tae-hyun
- Country of origin: South Korea
- Original language: Korean
- No. of episodes: 12

Production
- Producer: Im Jung-ah
- Production location: South Korea
- Camera setup: Multi-camera
- Running time: approx. 1 hour

Original release
- Network: JTBC
- Release: April 23 – July 16, 2016

Half-Moon Friends (Korean: 반달친구; RR: Bandalchingu) is a South Korean television entertainment program aired by JTBC from April 23, 2016 to July 16, 2016, total of 12 Episodes. It is also distributed online on MiaoPai, a popular Chinese video-streaming application, recording average of six million views for each episode and surpassing 32,100,000 views in accumulated number.

This is also the final activity of Nam Tae-hyun with WINNER, who soon left the group in November 2016.

== Format ==
The shows features Winner members interacting with children ranging from 4 to 7 years of ages. The show is meant to show the friendship that can grow between idols who have lived the trainee life for many years and children who often spend time alone due to busy parents.

WINNER members halt their promotional schedule to filmed the show in a daycare center for 15 days.

== Cast ==
=== Teachers ===
For the children to easily memorize the names of Winner members, they created cute nicknames for themselves.

| Name | Nickname |
|---|---|
| Kim Jin-woo | Jyu-jyu Teacher (쥬쥬쌤) |
| Lee Seung-hoon | Hat Teacher (모자쌤) |
| Song Min-ho | Candy Teacher (캔디쌤) |
| Kang Seung-yoon | Yoo-ni Teacher (유니쌤) |
| Nam Tae-hyun | Monster Teacher (괴물쌤) |

=== Students ===
| Name | Age | Description |
|---|---|---|
| Jeon Seo-yeon (전서연) | 7 | Full of aegyo, has leadership and is considered the prettiest |
| Shin Min-seo (신민서) | 7 | Chic and eye-smile is her trademark |
| Park Yeo-joon (박여준) | 7 | Has the best body as he does 40 push-ups a day |
| Joo Ji-woo (주지우) | 7 | Takes care of twin sister Seo-woo, an energetic mood maker; son of Joo Hee-jung |
| Joo Seo-woo (주서우) | 7 | Twin sister of Ji-woo and is polite; daughter of Joo Hee-jung |
| Lee Nam-woo (이남우) | 6 | Manly, older twin brother of Jung-woo |
| Lee Jung-woo (이정우) | 6 | Cheerful, younger twin brother of Nam-woo |
| Jeon Min-joon (전민준) | 6 | Older brother of Jei, is chic but warm to people he's close to |
| Park Ha-yul (박하율) | 4 | Youngest and knows how to be funny |
| Jeon Jae-yi / Jei (전재이) | 4 | Younger sister of Min-joon who eats a lot |

== Episodes ==
| | Airing Date | Narrator | Guest | Ratings |
|---|---|---|---|---|
| Episode 1 | April 23, 2016 | | Yoo Hee-yeol | 0.3% |
| Episode 2 | April 30, 2016 | | | NR |
| Episode 3 | May 7, 2016 | | | 0.6% |
| Episode 4 | May 14, 2016 | | Kim Dong Hyun | 0.5% |
| Episode 5 | May 21, 2016 | | Shin Dong-woo; Lee Soo-min | 0.5% |
| Episode 6 | May 28, 2016 | | Shin Dong-woo; Lee Soo-min | 0.5% |
| Episode 7 | June 11, 2016 | | | NR |
| Episode 8 | June 18, 2016 | | | 0.5% |
| Episode 9 | June 25, 2016 | | | 0.3% |
| Episode 10 | July 2, 2016 | | | 0.5% |
| Episode 11 | July 9, 2016 | Kang Seung-yoon | | 0.4% |
| Episode 12 | July 16, 2016 | | | 0.5% |
