= Everyday (Winner album) =

- Day version of Everyday

Studio album by Winner
- Released: April 4, 2018
- Recorded: 2017–18
- Genres: Trap; tropical house; pop rock; R&B
- Length: 43:56
- Languages: Korean; Japanese
- Labels: YG; YGEX
- Producer: Winner

Winner chronology
Our Twenty For (2017)	Everyday (2018)	We (2019)

Night version
- Alternate "Night version" cover

Singles from Everyday
- 1. "Everyday" Released: April 4, 2018

Music video
- "Everyday" on YouTube

Everyday, stylized as EVERYD4Y, is the second studio album of South Korean group Winner, released four years after their debut album, 2014 S/S, in 2014. This is the first studio album of Winner after the departure of Nam Tae-hyun. The album was released on April 4, 2018, by the group's record label, YG Entertainment. Like previous albums, the members were credited for writing the lyrics and composing the majority of the album's songs. The album is available in two different designs, Day and Night versions. The Day version has a clean silver background with Winner's "W" mark and the stylized title of the album, while the Night version has a black background with a black and white group photo of Winner sitting on a couch.

== Composition ==
The members produced the majority of the music for this album themselves, with the help of other in-house producers such as Airplay, Millenium, Future Bounce, and others. Title track "Everyday" and its music video was released on April 4. The single is described as a mixture of pop and chill trap with delicate lyrics. The album features a total of twelve tracks, including two special bonus songs in Korean from their Japanese single album Our Twenty For, "Raining" and "Have A Good Day"; as well as Mino's solo song, "Turn Off The Light." "La La" was previously introduced at 2016 EXIT Tour in Seoul.

== Track listing ==
No.	Title	Lyrics	Music	Arrangement	Length
1.	"Everyday"	Kang Seung-yoon; Song Min-ho; Lee Seung-hoon	Seung-yoon; Airplay; Min-ho	Airplay	3:26
2.	"Air"	Seung-yoon; Min-ho; Seung-hoon	Seung-yoon; Airplay	Airplay	3:45
3.	"Hello" (여보세요; yeoboseyo)	Min-ho; Seung-hoon; Millennium	Min-ho; Millennium	Millennium	3:47
4.	"Turn Off the Light" (손만 잡고 자자; sonman jabgo jaja; solo performed by Mino)	Min-ho	Min-ho; Future Bounce	Future Bounce	3:17
5.	"La La"	Seung-yoon; Min-ho; Seung-hoon	Seung-yoon; Kang Uk-jin	Uk-jin	3:36
6.	"For" (애 걔; ae gyae)	Seung-yoon; Min-ho; Seung-hoon	Seung-yoon; Uk-jin; Diggy; Min-ho	Uk-jin; Diggy	3:18
7.	"We Were" (예뻤더라; yeppeossdeola)	Seung-yoon	Seung-yoon; Airplay	Airplay	3:55
8.	"Luxury" (사치; sachi)	Seung-yoon; Min-ho; Seung-hoon	Seung-yoon; Uk-jin; Diggy	Uk-jin; Diggy	3:23
9.	"Movie Star"	Seung-yoon; Min-ho; Seung-hoon	Seung-yoon; Airplay	Airplay	3:17
10.	"Special Night"	Seung-hoon; Min-ho	Seung-hoon; Airplay; Seung-yoon	Airplay	3:45
11.	"Raining" (Korean version)	Seung-hoon; Min-ho	Seung-hoon; Uk-jin	Uk-jin	3:42
12.	"Have a Good Day" (Korean version)	Min-ho; Seung-hoon	Min-ho; Uk-jin; Seung-yoon	Uk-jin	3:45
Total length:					43:56

== Charts ==
Chart (2018)	Peak position
French Download Albums (SNEP)	146
South Korean Albums (Gaon)	1
US World Albums (Billboard)	6

"Everyday" (single)
Chart (2018)	Peak position
South Korea (Gaon)	2
South Korea (Billboard Korea K-Pop 100)	3

== Awards ==
=== Music program awards ===
Song	Program	Date
"Everyday"	M Countdown (Mnet)	April 12, 2018
"Everyday"	M Countdown (Mnet)	May 3, 2018
"Everyday"	Show! Music Core (MBC)	April 14, 2018
"Everyday"	Inkigayo (SBS)	April 15, 2018

=== Melon Popularity Award ===
Song	Award	Date	Ref.
"Everyday"	Weekly Popularity Award	April 16, 2018	
"Everyday"	Weekly Popularity Award	April 23, 2018	
"Everyday"	Weekly Popularity Award	April 30, 2018	
"Everyday"	Weekly Popularity Award	May 7, 2018	
"Everyday"	Weekly Popularity Award	May 14, 2018	

== Release history ==
Release history for Everyday
Region	Date	Version	Format	Label	Ref
South Korea	April 4, 2018	Korean	CD	YG	—
Various	April 4, 2018	Korean	Digital download; streaming	YG	—
Japan	October 3, 2018	Japanese	CD; DVD	YGEX	
Various	October 3, 2018	Japanese	Digital download; streaming	YGEX	
