= Fate Number For =

- Digital cover

Single album by Winner
- Released: April 4, 2017
- Recorded: 2016–17
- Genre: Tropical house; R&B
- Length: 14:08
- Language: Korean; Japanese
- Label: YG; KT Music; YGEX
- Producer: Winner

Winner chronology
Exit : E (2016)	Fate Number For (2017)	Our Twenty For (2017)

Singles from Fate Number For
- 1. "Really Really" / "Fool" Released: April 4, 2017

Fate Number For is the first single album by South Korean boy group Winner. It marks the first comeback for the group as four members, after the departure of Nam Tae-hyun in 2016.

== Background ==
In January 2017, the members started hinting at an upcoming comeback, and on February 16, it was reported that they'll be shooting music videos for two of their new songs in the United States. On March 17, it was confirmed by YG Entertainment that the group would be releasing new music on April 4, with under the title Fate Number For. Throughout March they released several teasers, including the name of the two title tracks "Really Really" and "Fool". On March 31, the first teaser of the music video for "Really Really" was released, revealing the track's tropical house sound, and on the following day, the teaser for "Fool" was released.

== Promotion ==
Winner held a celebratory party on April 1, with influential figures from the media and the fashion industry invited to the event to celebrate the album's release. From April 2 to 4, a showroom exhibiting the concept of the band's new album was revealed. They did a countdown live show on April 4 and told the behind stories of their comeback and future plans, revealing other events planned for their fan club. Winner held their first comeback stage on MBC's Show! Music Core on April 8, it will be the band's first-ever appearance on the show since their debut. They also performed live on Inkigayo the following day.

== Commercial performance ==
"Fate Number For" entered and peaked at number 2 on the Gaon Album Chart, on the chart issue dated April 2–8, 2017. The single album stayed at number 2 in its second week. In its third week, the single album fell to number 8 and to number 18 in its fourth week.

The single album entered at number 2 on the chart for the month of April 2017, with 63,573 physical copies sold. The single album has sold 66,494 physical copies in 2017.

== Track listing ==
Fate Number For
No.	Title	Lyrics	Music	Arrangement	Length
1.	"Really Really"	Kang Seung-yoon; Song Min-ho; Lee Seung-hoon	Yoon; Kang Uk-jin; Mino	Uk-jin	3:23
2.	"Fool"	Seung-yoon	Seung-yoon; Airplay	Airplay	3:41
Total length:					7:04

== Charts ==
Chart (2017)	Peak position
South Korea (Gaon Album Chart)	2

"Really Really"

Chart (2017)	Peak position
China (QQ Music Weekly Chart)	35
South Korea (Gaon Digital Chart)	1
US World Digital Songs (Billboard)	3

"Fool"

Chart (2017)	Peak position
China (QQ Music Weekly Chart)	16
South Korea (Gaon Digital Chart)	6
US World Digital Songs (Billboard)	4

Really Really music programs wins
Program	Date
M Countdown (Mnet)	April 13, 2017
M Countdown (Mnet)	April 20, 2017
MBC's Show! Music Core	April 22, 2017
SBS's Inkigayo	April 16, 2017
SBS's Inkigayo	April 23, 2017

== Sales ==
=== Download ===
"Really Really"

Region	Sales (2017)	
Region	South Korean Download Chart(Gaon)	2,500,000+

== Release history ==
Region	Date	Format	Label	Ref
South Korea	April 4, 2017	Digital download; streaming	YG	
Worldwide	April 4, 2017	Digital download; streaming	YG	
South Korea	April 5, 2017	CD	YG; KT Music	
Japan	April 7, 2017	Digital download; streaming	YGEX	
Japan	May 31, 2017	CD	YGEX	
