= Remember (Winner album) =

- Digital cover

Studio album by Winner
- Released: April 9, 2020
- Recorded: 2019–20
- Genre: Ballad; dance; K-pop; Hip hop; R&B
- Length: 43:03
- Language: Korean; Japanese
- Label: YG; YGEX
- Producer: Airplay; Diggy; Future Bounce; Ham Seung-cheon; Kang Uk-jin; P.K; R.Tee

Winner chronology
Cross (2019)	Remember (2020)	Holiday (2022)

Singles from Remember
- 1. "Hold" Released: March 26, 2020; 2. "Remember" Released: April 9, 2020

Remember is the third studio album by South Korean boy band Winner. The album was released on April 9, 2020, by YG Entertainment. The album contains 12 tracks, including the pre-release single "Hold" and the title track "Remember", which were written by Mino. The physical version is available in two versions: Us, and You. Remember is the follow-up to their third extended play Cross, released in 2019.

== Background and development ==
On March 17, 2020, YG Entertainment revealed the date for the single "Hold" to be March 26. On March 18, YG Entertainment revealed the date for the album Remember to be April 9 and that 12 songs would be on the album. On March 19, YG Entertainment confirmed the group's collaboration with Lee Su-hyun for the music video of "Hold". On March 24, YG Entertainment posted the first teaser for the music video of "Hold". On March 25, YG Entertainment posted the second teaser for the music video of "Hold".

On April 1, YG Entertainment posted the album track listing, revealing that Remember contains eight new songs, including pre-release single "Hold" and lead single "Remember", and "four of the most loved songs from our first album as four-membered versions". On April 7, YG Entertainment posted the first teaser for the music video of "Remember". On April 8, YG posted the second teaser for the music video of "Remember".

== Music and composition ==
In an interview with Soompi, Yoon described "Just Dance" as "a fun track with a message" and "My Bad" as "a sexy, mid-tempo track that he’s had in his archives for a while". He went on to say that "Well" "was inspired by his statement to fans at live broadcasts: 'Eat well, sleep well, rest well.' Written and composed by Lee Seung Hoon, 'Serenade' is the rapper’s solo track that perfectly captures the excitement from concerts".

== Critical reception ==
Professional ratings
Review scores
Source	Rating
Allkpop	8/10

Gina of Seoulbeats wrote that "the album combines new and old, fun and somber tracks to provide a diverse experience of Winner’s capabilities" and called it "a very refined album, one that’ll truly be a pleasant surprise from start to finish".

Eric Wirsing of Allkpop described the album as "fairly mellow" with "few club bangers, but also more than a few softer cuts".

== Track listing ==
Remember track listing
No.	Title	Lyrics	Music	Arrangement	Length
1.	"Remember"	Song Min-ho	Song Min-ho; Kang Uk-jin; Diggy	Kang Uk-jin; Diggy	3:43
2.	"Dduk" (뚝; Jinu solo)	Kang Seung-yoon	Kang Seung-yoon; Airplay	Airplay	3:30
3.	"Hold" (뜸)	Song Min-ho	Song Min-ho; R.Tee	R.Tee	2:56
4.	"Just Dance" (막춤)	Kang Seung-yoon; Song Min-ho; Lee Seung-hoon	Kang Seung-yoon; Kang Uk-jin; Diggy	Kang Uk-jin; Diggy	3:20
5.	"My Bad"	Song Min-ho; Lee Seung-hoon	Song Min-ho; Future Bounce	Song Min-ho; Future Bounce	3:55
6.	"Teaser"	Kang Seung-yoon; Song Min-ho; Lee Seung-hoon	Kang Seung-yoon; Kang Uk-jin; Diggy	Kang Uk-jin; Diggy	3:44
7.	"Well"	Kang Seung-yoon; Song Min-ho; Lee Seung-hoon	Kang Seung-yoon; Kang Uk-jin; Diggy	Kang Uk-jin; Diggy	3:42
8.	"Serenade" (세레나데; Hoony solo)	Lee Seung-hoon	Lee Seung-hoon; Kang Uk-jin; Diggy	Kang Uk-jin; Diggy	3:16
9.	"Empty" (공허해; 4 version)	Kim Han-bin; Song Min-ho; Kim Ji-won	Kim Han-bin; P.K	P.K	3:40
10.	"Don't Flirt" (끼부리지마; 4 version)	iHwak; Ham Seung-chun; Kang Uk-jin; Song Min-ho; Lee Seung-hoon	Ham Seung-chun; Kang Uk-jin; iHwak	Ham Seung-chun; Kang Uk-jin	3:25
11.	"Color Ring" (컬러링; 4 version)	Kang Seung-yoon; Song Min-ho; Lee Seung-hoon	Kang Seung-yoon; Ham Seung-chun; Uk-jin; iHwak; Dee.P	Kang Seung-chun; Kang Uk-jin	3:55
12.	"Different" (4 version)	Kang Seung-yoon; Song Min-ho; Lee Seung-hoon	Song Min-ho; Kang Seung-yoon	Airplay	3:57
Total length:					43:03

== Charts ==
=== Album ===
Chart (2020)	Peak position
South Korean Albums (Gaon)	3

=== Singles ===
Song	Chart (2020)	Peak position
Hold (뜸)	South Korea (Gaon)	21
Hold (뜸)	South Korea (K-pop Hot 100)	16
Remember	South Korea (Gaon)	41
Remember	South Korea (K-pop Hot 100)	23

== Release history ==
Release history for Remember
Region	Date	Format	Version	Label	Ref
Various	April 9, 2020	Digital download; streaming	Korean	YG	
South Korea	April 9, 2020	CD	Korean	YG; YG Plus	
Japan	July 22, 2020	CD; DVD	Japanese	YGEX	
Various	July 22, 2020	Digital download; streaming	Japanese	YGEX	—
