= Lee Seung-hoon (rapper) =

South Korean rapper (born 1992)

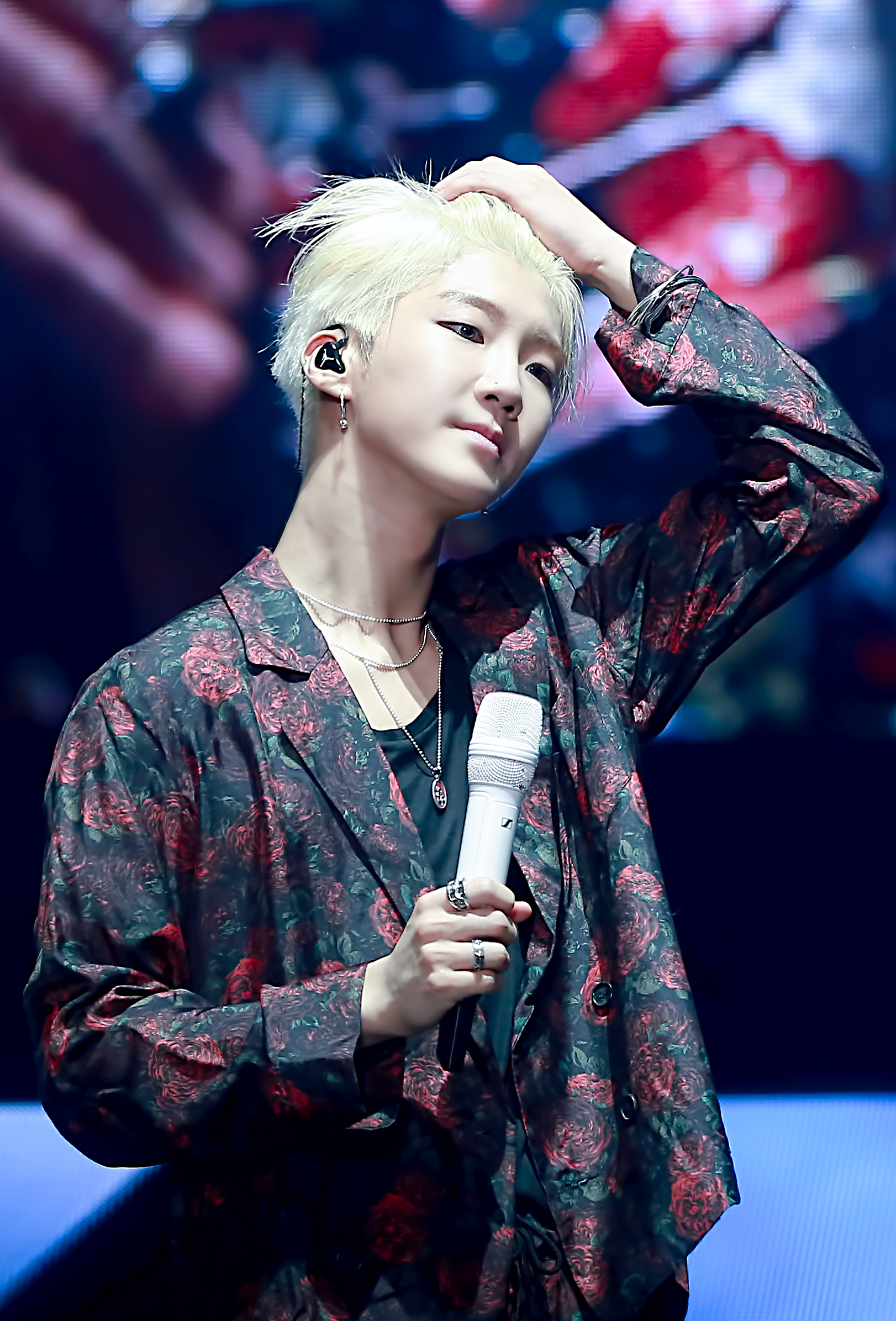
- Lee in 2018
- Born: January 11, 1992 (age 34); Dongnae District, Busan, South Korea
- Occupations: Rapper; dancer
- Musical career
- Genres: K-pop; hip-hop; dance
- Instrument: Vocals
- Years active: 2014–present
- Label: YG
- Member of: Winner; YG Family
- Website: yg-winner.co.kr

Korean name
- Hangul: 이승훈
- Hanja: 李昇勳
- RR: I Seunghun
- MR: I Sŭnghun

Lee Seung-hoon (/iː sʊŋhuːn/; Korean: 이승훈; born January 11, 1992), also known by the mononym Hoony, is a South Korean rapper and dancer. His musical career began in 2011 as a contestant in the first installation of K-pop Star (2011–2012); where he caught the attention of YG Entertainment CEO Yang Hyun-suk and was signed under his agency. Lee debuted with Winner on August 17, 2014, after the band competed and were titled as the victors of WIN: Who is Next (2013), and as a soloist on July 15, 2024.

== Life and career ==
=== 1992–2010: Early life ===
Lee Seung-hoon was born on January 11, 1992, in Dongnae District, Busan, South Korea, as the youngest succeeding two daughters. His father's absence in Lee's childhood was prominent due to his occupation as a businessman based in Vietnam. His eldest sister had also moved to Seoul when he was a child. Lee pursued dance at a young age and became adamant to join YG Entertainment since his enrollment in high school; however, his interest in dance resulted in severe back pains and restricted Lee to choreograph when it occurred. Lee relied on acupuncture as treatment for his nerves along his spine that suffered from irritation.

=== 2011–2015: Career beginnings and debut with Winner ===
20-year-old Lee (Korean age) moved to Seoul after he completed his secondary education as an attempt to enter the music industry. His motivation heightened after he witnessed Hoya of Infinite, a fellow peer in dance from his hometown, accomplish his dreams. Lee then formed the dance team "Honest Boys" (바른아이들; Bareun aideul) with friends from Busan and showcased their performances on the streets of Seoul. The trio auditioned for the first installation of Korea's Got Talent (2011) and was soon eliminated from the talent show at the preliminaries. He further auditioned for entertainment companies but did not succeed. Lee joined a choreography team in which he became its team leader and created a dance routine for G-Dragon of Big Bang and his flash mob performance for Bean Pole and their campaign in 2011.

In his final attempt at pursuing his goal, Lee successfully auditioned for the inaugural season of K-pop Star (2011–2012), a music audition program. He received attention for renting a four pyeong (13.22 square metre) room one minute away from YG Entertainment, home to his favorite artists. His creativity and wittiness also stood out to many – displayed in the cover performance of Dynamic Duo's "Father" (아버지; Abeoji). The hip-hop duo credited Lee for his contribution in ushering more attention to their songs than its initial success bringing in more profit. Namely, G-Dragon and Psy expressed their interest and added they were watching him and his stage. BoA voiced her desire to work with him while JYP Entertainment CEO Park Jin-young stated Lee was the only contestant he viewed as a "true artist". Moreover, K.Will noted his stages were the most inspirational apropos of it. He overall placed fourth behind Park Jimin, Lee Hi and Baek A-yeon. His newfound rise followed an appearance on Strong Heart, performance at Youth Festival in Seoul and photographed for a spread entitled "Boys Like Girls" in Vogue Girl Korea for the month of June with K-pop Star contestant Jae Park. He and Lee Hi signed an exclusive contract with YG Entertainment and was situated into its trainee system in May.

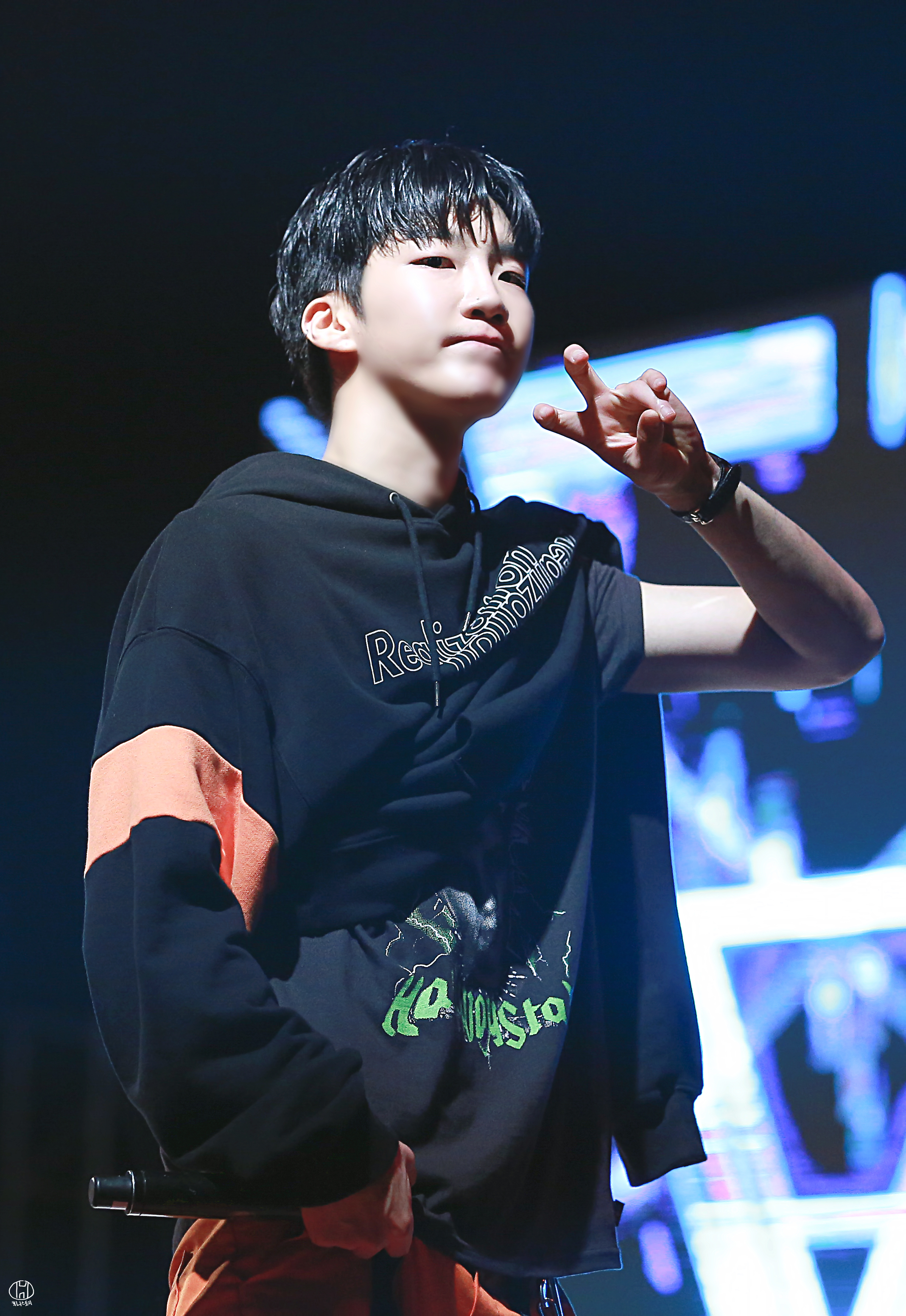
Lee performing at the Halla University Festival

On February 25, 2013, YG Entertainment CEO Yang Hyun-suk stated Lee would shine best in a boy band contrary to as a soloist thus his preparation for debut in their upcoming team; however, he participated as a contestant for WIN: Who is Next? (2013) which involved two assembles consisting of male trainees under the label (A and B) who would battle for the chance to debut by series end after embarking on a one-hundred day journey. Lee was placed in "Team A" with Kim Jin-woo, Song Min-ho, Kang Seung-yoon and Nam Tae-hyun. In the series finale, Team A had won the show and would debut under the name "Winner". Lee made his official debut with the five-piece band on August 17, 2014, with the studio album entitled 2014 S/S. The band's success upon debut was recorded as "unprecedented" by Korean media outlets and were dubbed as "monster rookies".

=== 2016–present: Solo endeavors ===
Amidst his activities with the band, Lee ventured into entertainment in which his credits include Eat, Sleep, Eat: Krabi (2016) with Baek Jong-won and Gong Seung-yeon, Mimi Shop (2018) with the inclusion of labelmate Sandara Park, and Law of the Jungle in Mexico (2018). He also served as the youngest dance mentor in Dancing High (2018) and enriched the knowledge of teens in South Korea by assisting them to thrive as dancers as they competed in teams in prospect of winning dance lessons in the United States. His credits further extends to Awesome Feed (2018), Door-to-Door Salesmen (2020) on YouTube, and I Want to Be a Celebrity (2022).

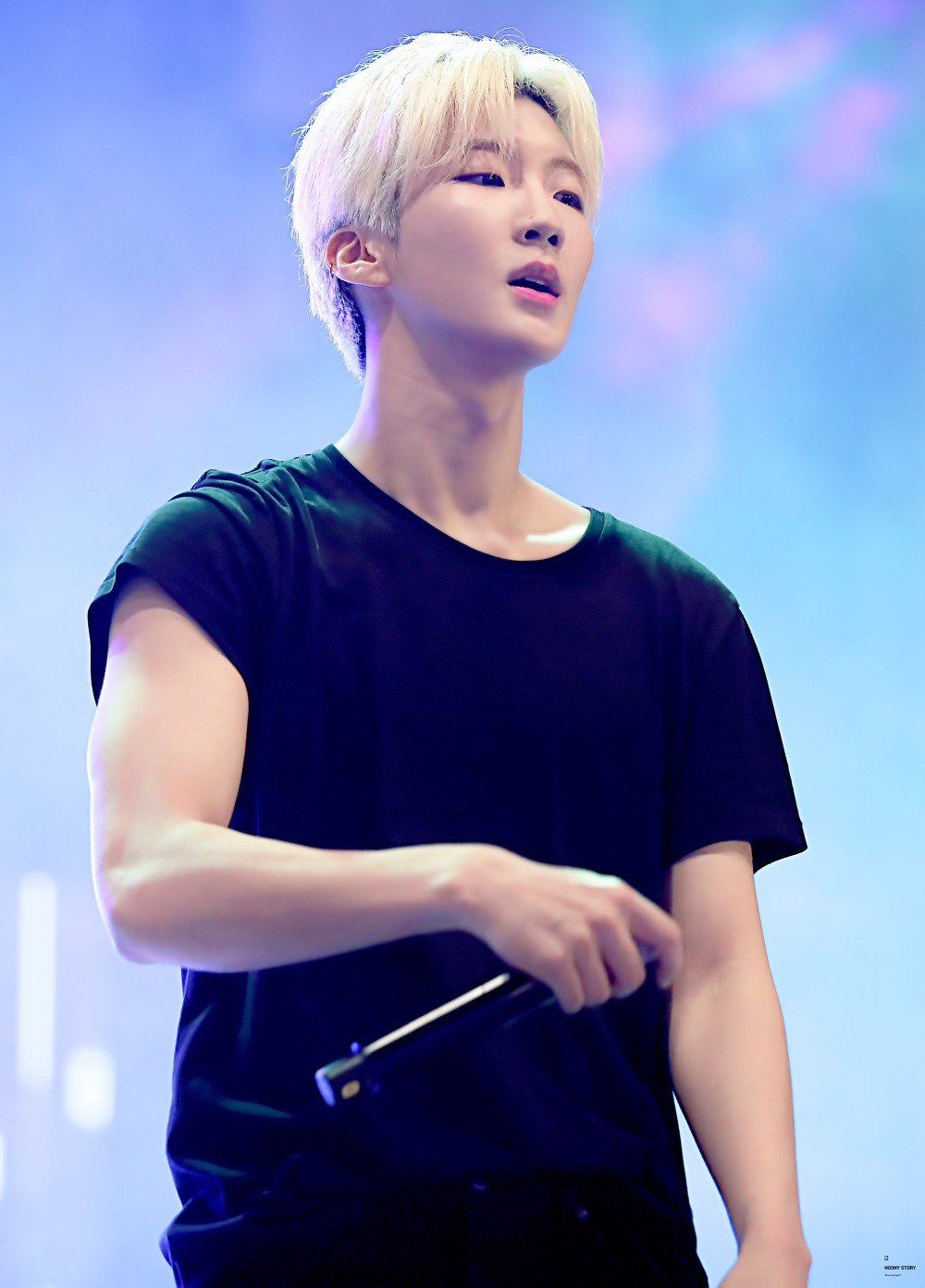
Lee performing at the Jangan University Festival in September 2018

On October 17, 2022, Lee launched his personal YouTube channel "This Seunghoon, That Seunghoon" and uploaded his first video to reach out to his fans and "address the gap between human Lee Seunghoon and idol Lee Seunghoon" and "reveal absolutely everything".

On February 28, 2023, it was announced that Lee was confirmed to be cast in the stage musical Dream High as one of the lead character roles, Song Sam-Dong, along with actor Eum Moon-suk and SF9 member Yoo Taeyang. This musical is based on a 2011 KBS2 drama of the same name.

On June 19, 2024, YG Entertainment announced that Lee Seunghoon was in the final stages of production for his debut album. On July 15, 2024, he released his first EP entitled My Type, with its lead single, "My Type" (딱 내 스타일이야). Lee took part as the album's main producer, demonstrating his exceptional producing skills, writing and composing all the tracks himself.

== Personal life ==
=== Military service ===
On basis of his mandatory military service, Lee enlisted on April 16, 2020, and served his training at the Nonsan Army Training Center for four weeks prior to fulfilling his military duty as a public service worker. Lee was discharged from his duties on January 14, 2022, after he completed one year and seven months of his enlistment.

== Artistry ==
=== Choreography and dance style ===
As a dancer, Lee's style is considered more relaxed compared to the usual vigorous movements found in most idols, as he puts more detailed elements in his choreography with accordance to its lyrics or sound. He is also viewed as a versatile dancer and choreographer due to his ability in executing various genres in his dance routine. Lee has often been cited as an "idea bank" and "genius choreographer" in which his stages encompassed creativity and uniqueness. 1Million Dance Studio CEO and choreographer Lia Kim expressed Lee knew many dancing techniques given the long period of time he has been dancing for. Kwon Young-deuk of YGX stated Lee fully immerses himself and "feels" the dance and also learns choreography the fastest in YG Entertainment.

For Winner, Lee has choreographed their debut lead singles "Empty" (공허해; gongheohae) and "Color Ring" from 2014 S/S and "Fool" from Fate Number For – which he created and finalized within five hours.

== Other ventures ==
=== Fashion ===
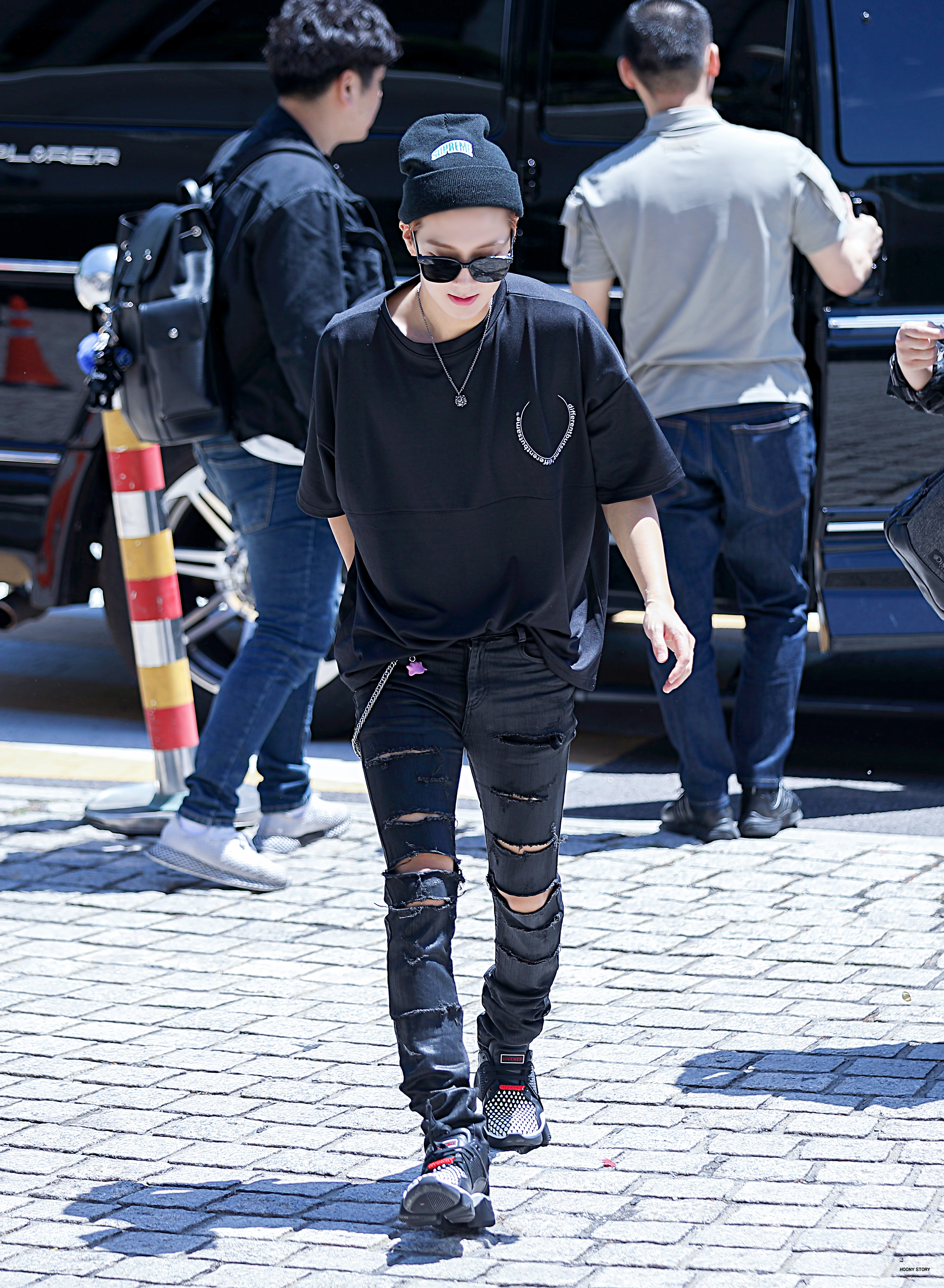
Lee attending a scheduled event in May 2019

In September 2017, Lee and his bandmate Mino were chosen as the influencers most suited in becoming ambassadors of the luxury brand, Burberry, appointed by its previous creative officer Christopher Bailey as they exhibited a "Viktor Horsting & Rolf Snoeren-like approach to haute couture". Both were labelled as winning front row looks and acquired advance access to the Burberry Spring 2018 collection two days after they landed at Heathrow Airport in London. In the fashion event, the London-based modelling agency AMCK Models' director and head scout, Patrick Egbon-Marshall gave Lee the sobriquet "Red King" and showed interest to scout him as a model to the agency.

=== Philanthropy ===
Within his publicized acts, Lee and his fans accomplished 2,220 kg of rice wreaths for the press conference of Dancing High (2018) of which the fans supplied 500 kg of its total. Lee chose to distribute the rice to elderlies of low-income who lived alone and to the disabled. He is also recognized as a regular donator alongside YG Entertainment and his fans for Korea Animal Rights Advocates (KARA).

== Discography ==
=== Extended plays ===
List of extended plays, showing selected details, selected chart positions, and sales figures
Title	Details	Peak chart positions	Sales
Title	Details	KOR	Sales
My Type	Released: July 15, 2024; Label: YG Entertainment; Formats: CD, digital download	18	KOR: 26,647

=== Singles ===
List of singles, showing year released, selected chart positions, sales, and name of the album
Title	Year	Peak chart positions		Sales	Album
Title	Year	KOR	KOR Hot	Sales	Album
As lead artist
"My Type" (딱 내 스타일이야)	2024	— (Note: "My Type" (딱 내 스타일이야) did not enter the Circle Digital Chart, but peaked at number 26 on the component download chart.)	—	—N/a	My Type
Other charted songs
"Mother's Doenjangguk" (어머니의 된장국)	2012	35	—	KOR: 207,928	SBS K팝 스타 TOP6
"Ma Boy 2" (일렉트로보이즈) (with Baek A-yeon)	2012	50	67	KOR: 116,457	SBS K팝 스타 Special No.3

=== Production credits ===
All song credits are adapted from the Korea Music Copyright Association's database, unless otherwise noted.

==== Solo work ====
List of songs, showing year released, and name of the album
Year	Song	Album	Lyricist		Composer	
Year	Song	Album	Credited	With	Credited	With
2019	"Flamenco"	Cross	Yes	–	Yes	Diggy, Kang Uk Jin
2020	"Serenade" (세레나데)	Remember	Yes	–	Yes	Kang Uk Jin
2024	"My Type" (딱 내 스타일이야)	My Type	Yes	Mino, Where The Noise	Yes	The Muze, Dee.P, Where The Noise
2024	"Thinkin' Bad Thimgs (나쁜 생각)	My Type	Yes	–	Yes	Kang Uk Jin, Diggy
2024	"Do Re Mi Fa Sol" (도레미파솔)	My Type	Yes	Where The Noise	Yes	Kang Uk Jin, Where The Noise, Diggy
2024	"Brother and Sister"	My Type	Yes	Jared Lee	Yes	Blood Circle, Jared Lee, Dee.P, Kim Uiju

==== Work as Winner ====
List of songs, showing year released, and name of the album
Year	Song	Album	Lyricist		Composer	
Year	Song	Album	Credited	With	Credited	With
2013	"Go Up"	WIN: Who Is Next 'Final Battle'	Yes	Mino, Kang Seung-yoon	No	–
2013	"Just Another Boy"	WIN: Who Is Next 'Final Battle'	Yes	Mino, Nam Tae-hyun, Teddy	No	–
2014	"Color Ring" (컬러링)	2014 S/S	Yes	Mino, Kang Seung-yoon	No	–
2014	"Don't Flirt" (끼부리지마)	2014 S/S	Yes	Ham Seung-cheon, iHwak, Mino, Kang Uk Jin	No	–
2014	"But" (사랑하지마)	2014 S/S	Yes	Mino, Nam Tae-hyun	No	–
2014	"Different"	2014 S/S	Yes	Mino, Kang Seung-yoon	No	–
2014	"Smile Again"	2014 S/S	Yes	Mino, Kang Seung-yoon	No	–
2016	"Baby Baby"	EXIT: E	Yes	Mino, Nam Tae-hyun	No	–
2016	"Sentimental" (센치해)	EXIT: E	Yes	Mino, Nam Tae-hyun	No	–
2016	"Immature" (철없어)	EXIT: E	Yes	Mino, Kang Seung-yoon	No	–
2017	"Really Really"	Fate Number For	Yes	Mino, Kang Seung-yoon	No	–
2017	"Love Me Love Me"	Our Twenty For	Yes	Mino, Kang Seung-yoon	No	–
2017	"Island"	Our Twenty For	Yes	Mino, Kang Seung-yoon, Bekuh Boom	No	–
2018	"Everyday"	Everyday	Yes	Mino, Kang Seung-yoon	No	–
2018	"Air"	Everyday	Yes	Mino, Kang Seung-yoon	No	–
2018	"La La"	Everyday	Yes	Mino, Kang Seung-yoon	No	–
2018	"For" (애 걔)	Everyday	Yes	Mino, Kang Seung-yoon	No	–
2018	"Luxury" (사치)	Everyday	Yes	Mino, Kang Seung-yoon	No	–
2018	"Movie Star"	Everyday	Yes	Mino, Kang Seung-yoon	No	–
2018	"Hello" (여보세요)	Everyday	Yes	Mino, Millenium	No	–
2018	"Special Night"	Everyday	Yes	Mino	Yes	Kang Seung-yoon, Airplay
2018	"Have A Good Day" (KR)	Everyday	Yes	Mino	No	–
2018	"Raining" (KR)	Everyday	Yes	Mino	Yes	Kang Uk-Jin
2018	"Millions"	Millions	Yes	Mino, Kang Seung-yoon	No	–
2019	"Ah Yeah" (아예)	We	Yes	Mino, Kang Seung-yoon	No	–
2019	"Mola" (몰라도너무몰라)	We	Yes	Mino, Kang Seung-yoon	No	–
2019	"Zoo" (동물의왕국)	We	Yes	Mino	No	–
2019	"Boom"	We	Yes	Mino, Kang Seung-yoon	No	–
2019	"Everyday" (remix)	We	Yes	Mino, Kang Seung-yoon	No	–
2019	"First Love" (2019) (첫사랑)	We	Yes	Mino, Jeon Hae-seong, Airplay	No	–
2019	"Soso"	Cross	Yes	Mino, Kang Seung-yoon	No	–
2019	"OMG"	Cross	Yes	Mino, Kang Seung-yoon	No	–
2019	"Dress Up" (빼입어)	Cross	Yes	Mino, Kang Seung-yoon	No	–
2019	"Don't Be Shy" (끄덕끄덕)	Cross	Yes	Mino	No	–
2020	"Just Dance" (막춤)	Remember	Yes	Mino, Kang Seung-yoon	No	–
2020	"Teaser"	Remember	Yes	Mino, Kang Seung-yoon	No	–
2020	"Well"	Remember	Yes	Mino, Kang Seung-yoon	No	–
2020	"My Bad"	Remember	Yes	Mino	No	–
2022	"10 Min" (10분)	Holiday	Yes	Kang Seung-yoon, Mino	No	–
2022	"Holiday"	Holiday	Yes	Kang Seung-yoon, Mino	No	–
2022	"Sweet Home" (집으로)	Holiday	Yes	Kang Seung-yoon, Mino	No	–
2022	"Family"	Holiday	Yes	Kang Seung-yoon, Mino, Ahn Young-joo, Young	No	–
2022	"Little Finger" (새끼손가락)	Holiday	Yes	Kang Seung-yoon, Mino	No	–

==== Other artists ====
List of songs, showing year released, and name of the album
Year	Artist	Song	Album	Lyricist		Composer	
Year	Artist	Song	Album	Credited	With	Credited	With
2017	Sechs Kies	"Back Hug" (백하그)	Another Light	Yes	Mino, Eun Ji-won, Bigtone, Min Yeon-jae	No	–

== Filmography ==
=== Television shows ===
Year	Title		Role	Notes	Ref.
Year	English	Korean	Role	Notes	Ref.
2011–2012	K-pop Star	K팝 스타	Contestant	Season 1; placed 4th overall	
2013	WIN: Who Is Next?	윈: 후 이즈 넥스트	Contestant	Team A member; formation of Winner	
2016	Eat Sleep Eat in Krabi	먹고 자고 먹고 끄라비 편	Cast member	with Gong Seung-yeon	
2018	Mimi Shop	미미샵	Cast member	Guest (Episodes 2–3); Intern (Episodes 11–15)	
2018	Law of the Jungle in Mexico	정글의 법칙 멕시코	Cast member	Episodes 320–324	
2018	Dancing High	댄싱하이	Mentor	—N/a	
2018	Awesome Feed	어썸피드	Cast member	—N/a	
2022	I Want to Be a Celebrity	셀럽이 되고 싶어	Cast member	—N/a	
2022	My House Sangjeon (Boss Pet)	우리집 상전	Cast member	—N/a	
2022–2023	Adventure by Accident	태어난 김에 세계일주	Panelist	Seasons 1–3; Episode 3 onward	

=== Web shows ===
Year	Title		Role	Notes	Ref.
Year	English	Korean	Role	Notes	Ref.
2020	Door-to-Door Salesmen	방문판매단	Cast Member	with Kwon Hyun-bin and Jang Su-won	
2022	Saturday Night Live Korea	SNL 코리아2	Host	Season 2 – Episode 12	

=== Music video appearances ===
Year	Title	Artist	Length	Ref.
2013	"Somebody"	15&	3:20	

=== Radio ===
Year	Network	Title	Ref.
2022	KBS Cool FM	Station Z: Lee Seunghoon's Special Night	

== Theater ==
Year	English title	Korean title	Role	Ref.
2023	Dream High	드림하이	Song Sam-dong	

== Awards and nominations ==
Name of the award ceremony, year presented, award category, nominee(s) of the award, and the result of the nomination
Award ceremony	Year	Category	Nominee(s)/work(s)	Result	Ref.
Fashionista Awards (Note: Jointly hosted by fashion magazine Celeb's Pick and Naver Fashion Beauty, the Fashionista Awards is an online awards ceremony that selects the best style icons based on surveys conducted through Naver.)	2017	Best Fashionista – SNS Icon	Lee Seung-hoon	Won	
Seoul Music Awards	2025	R&B / Hip-hop Award	Lee Seung-hoon	Nominated	
