= Millions (Winner song) =

- Digital cover

Single by Winner
- Language: Korean
- Released: December 19, 2018
- Studio: YG (Seoul)
- Genre: Dance; tropical pop
- Length: 3:29
- Label: YG; Genie
- Composers: Yoon; Kang Uk-jin; Diggy
- Lyricists: Yoon; Mino; Hoony
- Producers: Yoon; Kang Uk-jin; Diggy

Winner singles chronology
"Everyday" (2018)	"Millions" (2018)	"Ah Yeah" (2019)

Music video
- "Millions" on YouTube

"Millions" is a song recorded by South Korean boy group Winner. It was released on December 19, 2018 under the label YG Entertainment and is distributed by Genie Music.

== Background and release ==
On December 11, 2018, YG Entertainment published a group poster with the words "Coming Soon". Two days later, it was revealed that Winner's comeback would consist of a single album that would be released online on December 19. On December 14, it was announced that the single was entitled "Millions" through a poster crediting Kang Seung-yoon, Song Min Ho and Lee Seung Hoon for the lyrics and Kang Seung-yoon, Kang Uk-jin and Diggy for the composition of the song.

Solo posters of the members were released on December 17 and a final poster was published a few hours prior to the release along with a teaser of the music video. The group held an hour-long comeback special live "Merry Millions Day" on Naver's V App on December 19 at 5 PM (KST). The music video was released at 6PM (KST). The making film was published the following day. A performance video with the full choreography was released on December 21.

== Composition ==
Tamar Herman of Billboard describes "Millions" as a "feel-good dance track that brings a summery feel" and that is "fronted by plucky strings, snappy drum beats, and bright whistle synth effects." Woo Jae-yeon of Yonhap News Agency defines it as "a tropical-pop dance song."

== Promotion ==
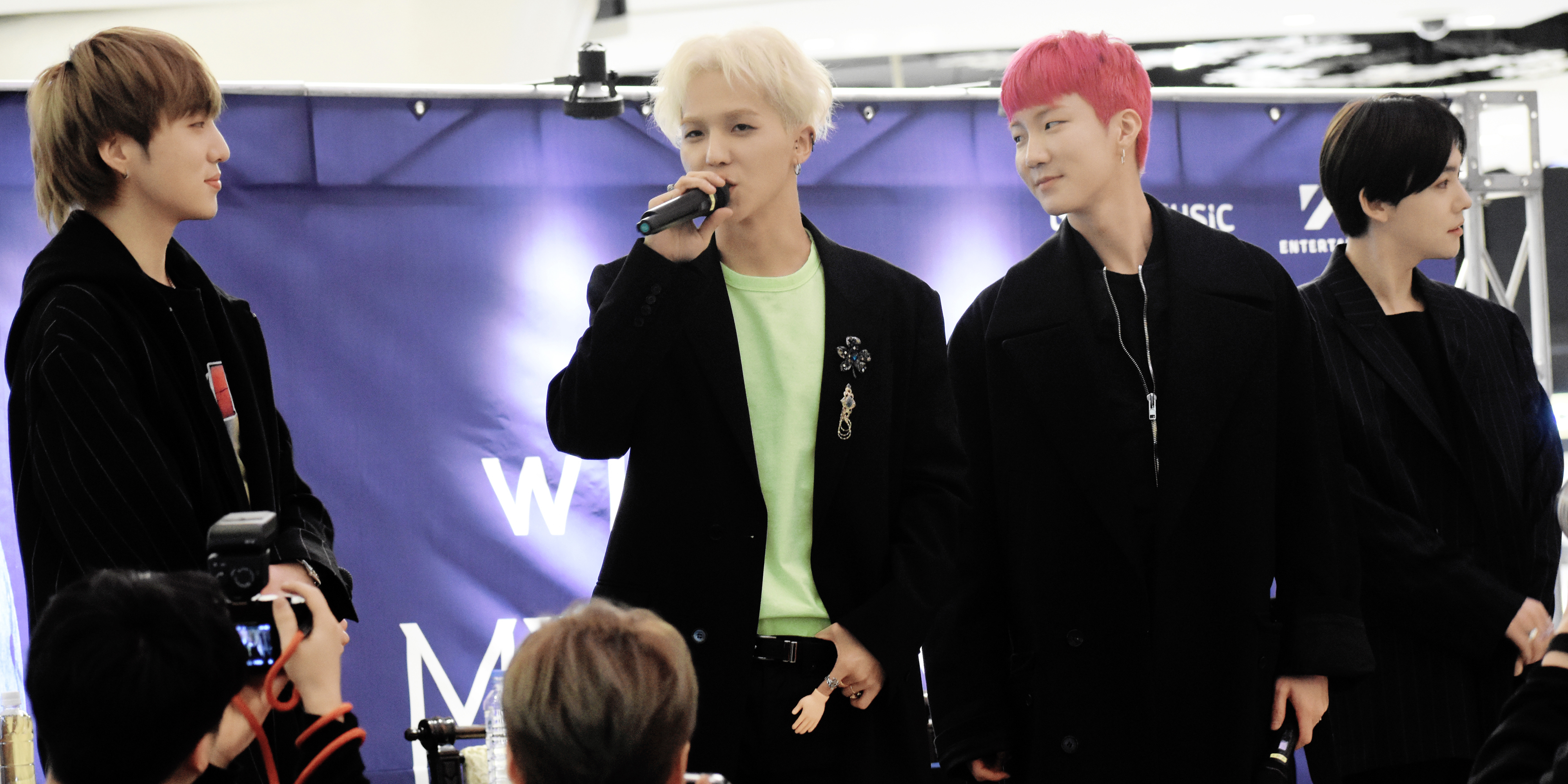
Winner during an autograph event in Jamsil, December 2018

Winner held their comeback stage on MBC's Show! Music Core on December 22. They promoted the song on several music programs in South Korea, including Inkigayo.

== Charts ==
Chart (2018–19)	Peak position
China (QQ Music Weekly Chart)	16
South Korea (Gaon Digital Chart)	2
South Korea (K–Pop Hot 100)	2
US World Digital Songs (Billboard)	5

== Awards and nominations ==
=== Music program awards ===
Program	Date	Ref.
M Countdown (Mnet)	December 27, 2018	
M Countdown (Mnet)	January 3, 2019	
Inkigayo (SBS)	December 30, 2018	
Inkigayo (SBS)	January 6, 2019	
Show Champion (MBC M)	January 2, 2019	
Show! Music Core (MBC)	January 5, 2019	
Music Bank (KBS)	January 11, 2019	

== Release history ==
Region	Date	Format	Label	Ref
Various	December 19, 2018	Digital download, streaming	YG Entertainment	
South Korea	December 24, 2018	CD, digital download, streaming	YG Entertainment	

== See also ==
- List of M Countdown Chart winners (2018)
- List of M Countdown Chart winners (2019)
