= Winner (band) =

South Korean boy band

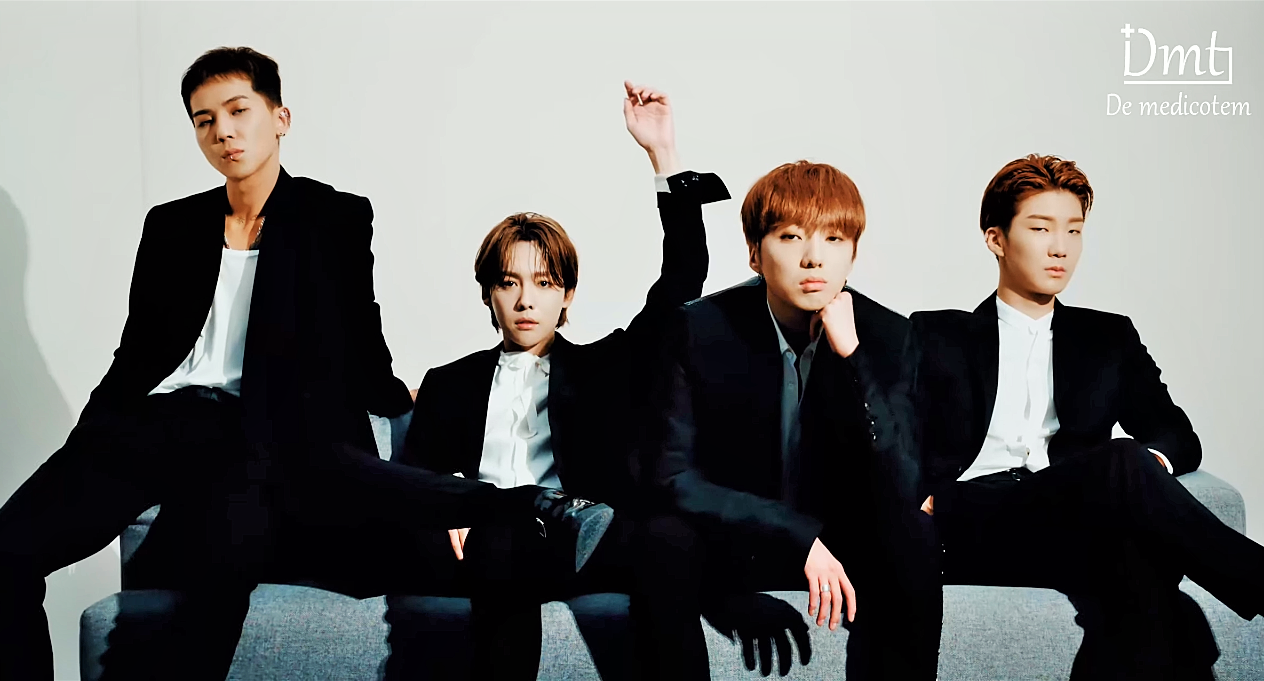
- Winner in 2020; From left to right: Mino, Kim Jin-woo, Kang Seung-yoon, and Lee Seung-hoon

Background information
- Origin: Seoul, South Korea
- Genres: K-pop; R&B; hip-hop
- Years active: 2014–present
- Label: YG
- Member of: YG Family
- Spinoffs: MOBB
- Members: Kim Jin-woo; Lee Seung-hoon; Mino; Kang Seung-yoon
- Past members: Nam Tae-hyun
- Website: yg-winner.com

Winner (/ˈwɪnər/; Korean: 위너; stylized in all caps) is a South Korean boy band formed by YG Entertainment in 2013. The band consists of four members: Kim Jin-woo, Lee Seung-hoon, Mino, and Kang Seung-yoon. Former member Nam Tae-hyun left the band in November 2016.

The band was introduced to the public through the reality survival program WIN: Who Is Next (2013), a collaboration between YG Entertainment and Mnet. The group debuted on August 17, 2014, with their first studio album, 2014 S/S. Its single, "Empty", became their first number one entry on South Korea's Gaon Digital Chart.

Winner has received awards from the Melon Music Awards, the Style Icon Awards and the MTV Asia Music Gala. Their lead single, "Really Really" from the album Fate Number For (2017) surpassed 100 million streams on the Gaon Music Chart.

== History ==
=== 2010–2013: Formation and early activities ===
Following the success of Big Bang (2006) and 2NE1 (2009), YG Entertainment conducted global and private auditions to form their next debuting act. The final lineup consisted of Kim Jin-woo and Nam Tae-hyun, who joined through private auditions in 2010 and 2011, respectively; Kang Seung-yoon and Lee Seung-hoon, both public figures and scouted from their appearances on Superstar K2 (2010) and K-pop Star (2011–2012), respectively; and Song Min-ho, who joined through a private audition in 2013, following the disbandment of his previous group, BoM (2011).

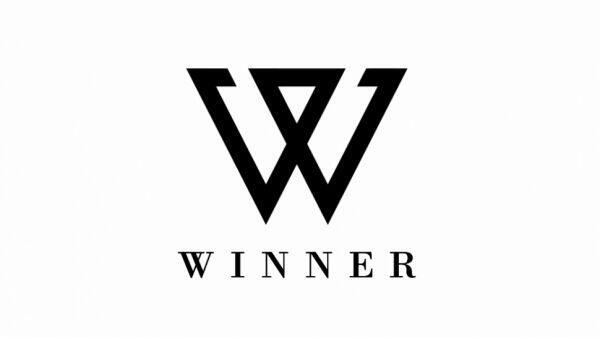
Image depicting Winner's logo (2014–2016)

The group's formation was documented in Mnet's WIN: Who Is Next (2013), a survival show that had two teams of trainees compete for the chance to debut under YG Entertainment and perform as the opening act for Big Bang's Japan Dome Tour. Over the course of 100 days, the teams competed in three rounds of performances and public voting. They were evaluated and mentored by YG Family artists, including Taeyang and G-Dragon. The finale was broadcast live from the SK Olympic Handball Gymnasium with approximately 3,000 attendees. It featured the teams' original songs "Go Up" and "Climax", both of which entered the Gaon Digital Chart at number 8 and 12, respectively. On October 25, "Team A" was announced as the winner.

At the end of 2013, Winner opened for Big Bang on the Japan Dome Tour. They held their first official event, "Hello! Winner", greeting 300 fans within an audience of 8,000 in Osaka. Winner later appeared as guest performers for 2NE1's All or Nothing World Tour in Seoul on March 1–2, 2014, They later joined additional 2NE1 tour stops in Asia and performed at the YG Family Power World Tour in Osaka on April 12, 2014.

=== 2014–2016: 2014 S/S, international recognition, and Nam's departure ===
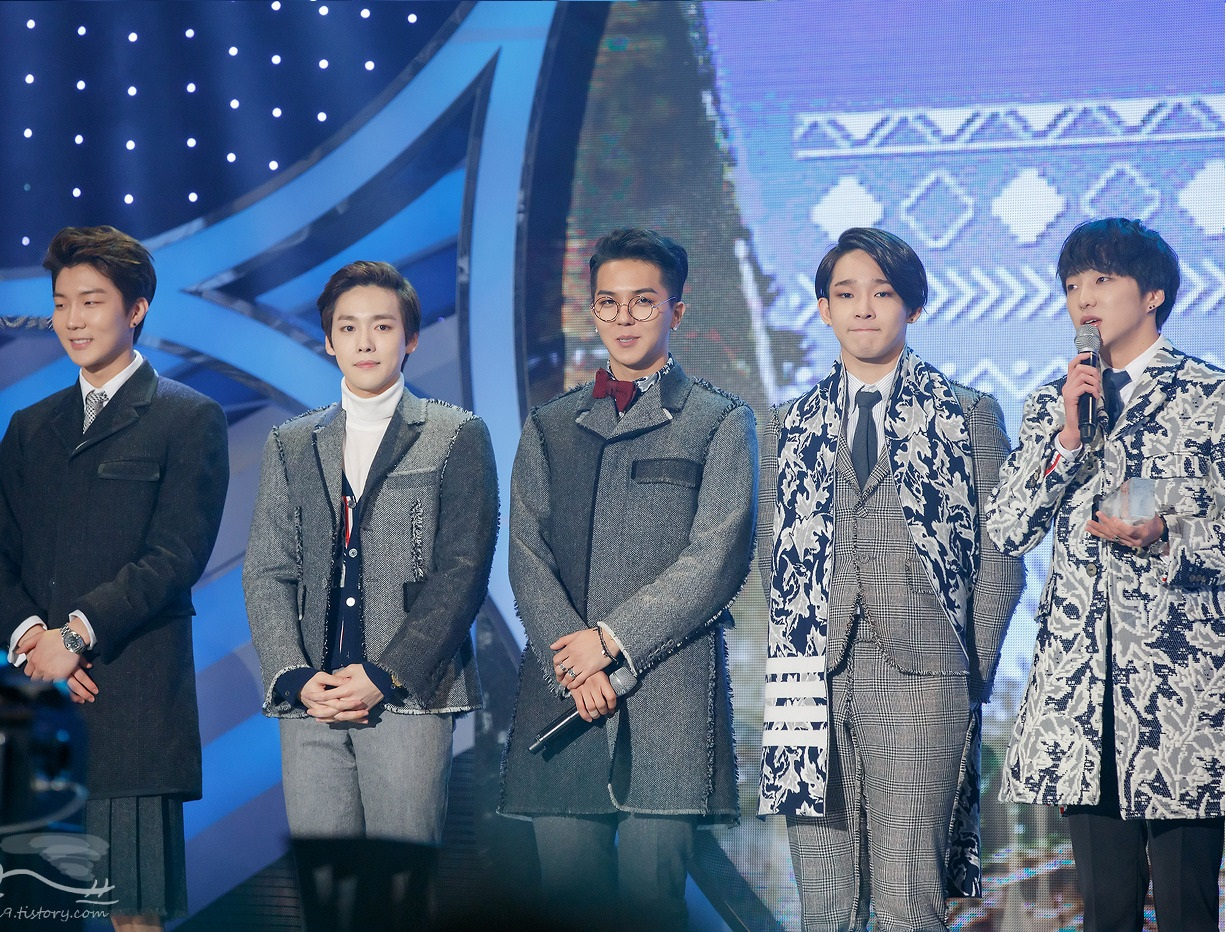
The five-piece receiving the bonsang award at the Melon Music Awards on November 13, 2014.

Eight months after the competition's end, Winner was reintroduced to the public between June and August 2014, holding a launch showcase at the Conrad Seoul Hotel on August 6 to introduce the band's musical direction and concept. The showcase involved a fashion show with models from YG KPlus and members of the group walking down a catwalk. Inspired by high-end fashion, it won the Red Dot Design Award for "Brand Concept", for being the first artist debut to utilize a fashion launch concept.

Winner officially debuted with the studio album, 2014 S/S, on August 17, 2014. It debuted atop the Gaon Album Chart and the Billboard World Albums Chart. Its lead singles, "Empty" (공허해; gongheohae) and "Color Ring", debuted on the Gaon Digital Chart at number 1 and 3, respectively. "Don't Flirt" (끼부리지마; kkibulijima) became the most downloaded B-side on the platform at the time. On August 21, they became the fastest act to win on a music television program, winning on M Countdown five days after their debut. On September 10, they released a Japanese version of 2014 S/S, which peaked at number two on the Oricon Albums Chart, and embarked on their first Japan tour. They received a bonsang (본상; lit. 'main prize') at the 2014 Melon Music Awards, and new artist awards both domestically and internationally. The band was also listed as one of the thirteen top breakout artists of 2014 by Fuse.

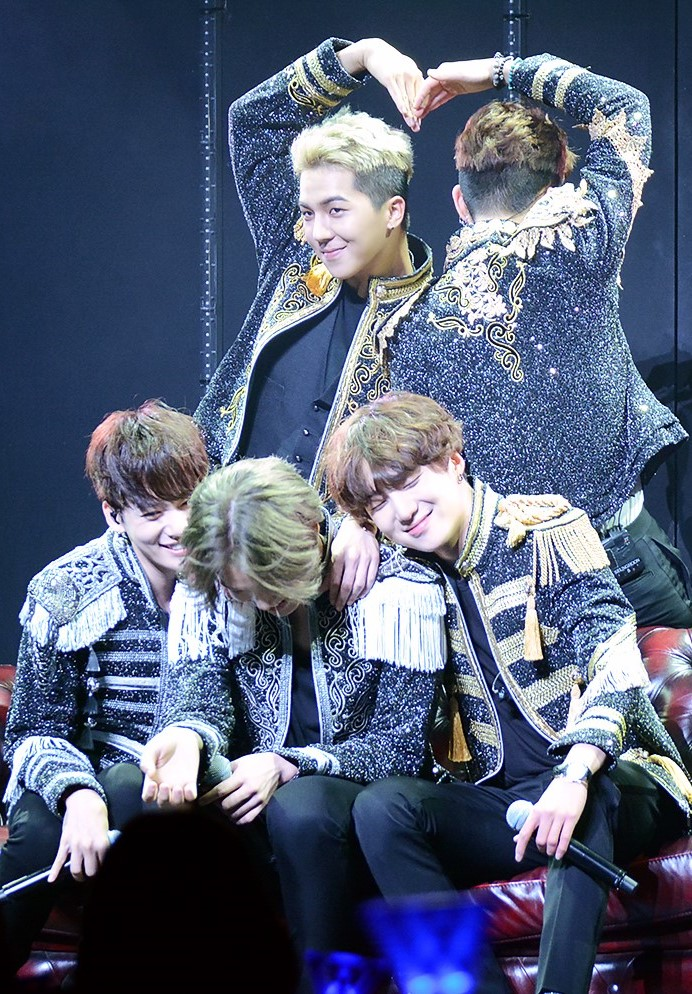
The quintet performing at the Winner Japan Tour 2015 in Nagoya, Japan.

After primarily focusing on in fan meetings in 2015, the group was scheduled to release five 'project releases' in 2016. On January 11, Winner released their song "Pricked", a duet between members Mino and Nam. On February 1, Winner released their EP Exit: E, which placed number two on the Gaon Album Chart and at number two on Billboard's World Albums Chart. Its lead single was the most-played song across eight South Korean music streaming platforms. The song "Baby Baby" became the most-streamed Korean song on QQ Music, a Chinese music streaming platform, in the first half of the same year. Winner held their first-ever concert tour in Korea, beginning their tour on March 12 and 13 with a performance at the Olympic Gymnastics Arena in Seoul. In June 2016, the group brought their Exit Tour to Japan.

The group starred in a variety show called Half-Moon Friends (2016), which aired on JTBC. The show garnered viewership both locally and internationally. In China, clips from the program reportedly accumulated more than 75 million views on the video sharing platform Miaopai and exceeded 100 million views across other online platforms. Their success in the country earned them the Overseas Popularity Award at the MTV Asia Music Gala.

In October 2016, Nam took a break from the group due to mental health concerns, and the remaining installments of the "Exit Movement" series were delayed indefinitely. On November 25, he officially departed from the band, leading to the project's cancellation.

=== 2017–2019: Reformation and continuing promotions ===
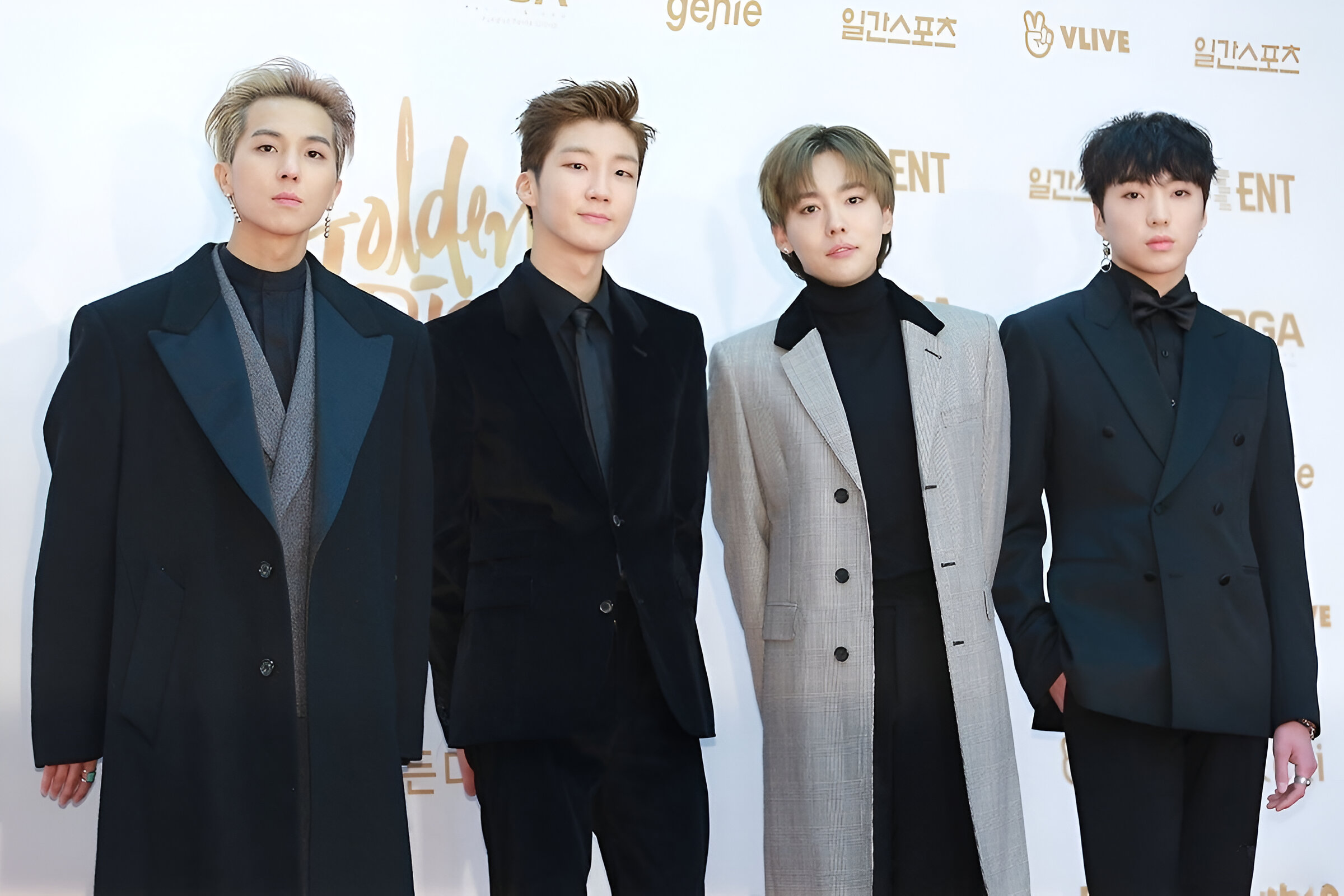
Winner on the red carpet for the 32nd Golden Disc Awards.

After a 14-month hiatus, the group returned as a quartet on April 4, 2017, with Fate Number For. The music video for the title track, "Really Really", was filmed by director Dave Meyers. The single debuted atop the Gaon Digital Chart and hit number three on the Billboard World Digital Song Sales, marking the group's highest position to date. According to Gaon Chart data, it surpassed 100 million streams while remaining on the chart and was chosen for Apple Music's "Best of the Week" list.

On May 31, they released their debut Japanese single album, which contained Japanese renditions of "Really Really" and "Fool". On August 4, Winner released their second single album, Our Twenty For, which included the lead singles "Love Me Love Me" and "Island". The former was chosen by Dazed Digital as one of the 20 best K-pop songs of 2017.

As part of tvN's New Journey to the West 4, Mino's request to appear on Youth Over Flowers with his fellow Winner members was fulfilled through a special supplementary show. Filming for Winner's Youth Over Flowers took place in Western Australia, and the show premiered on November 7.

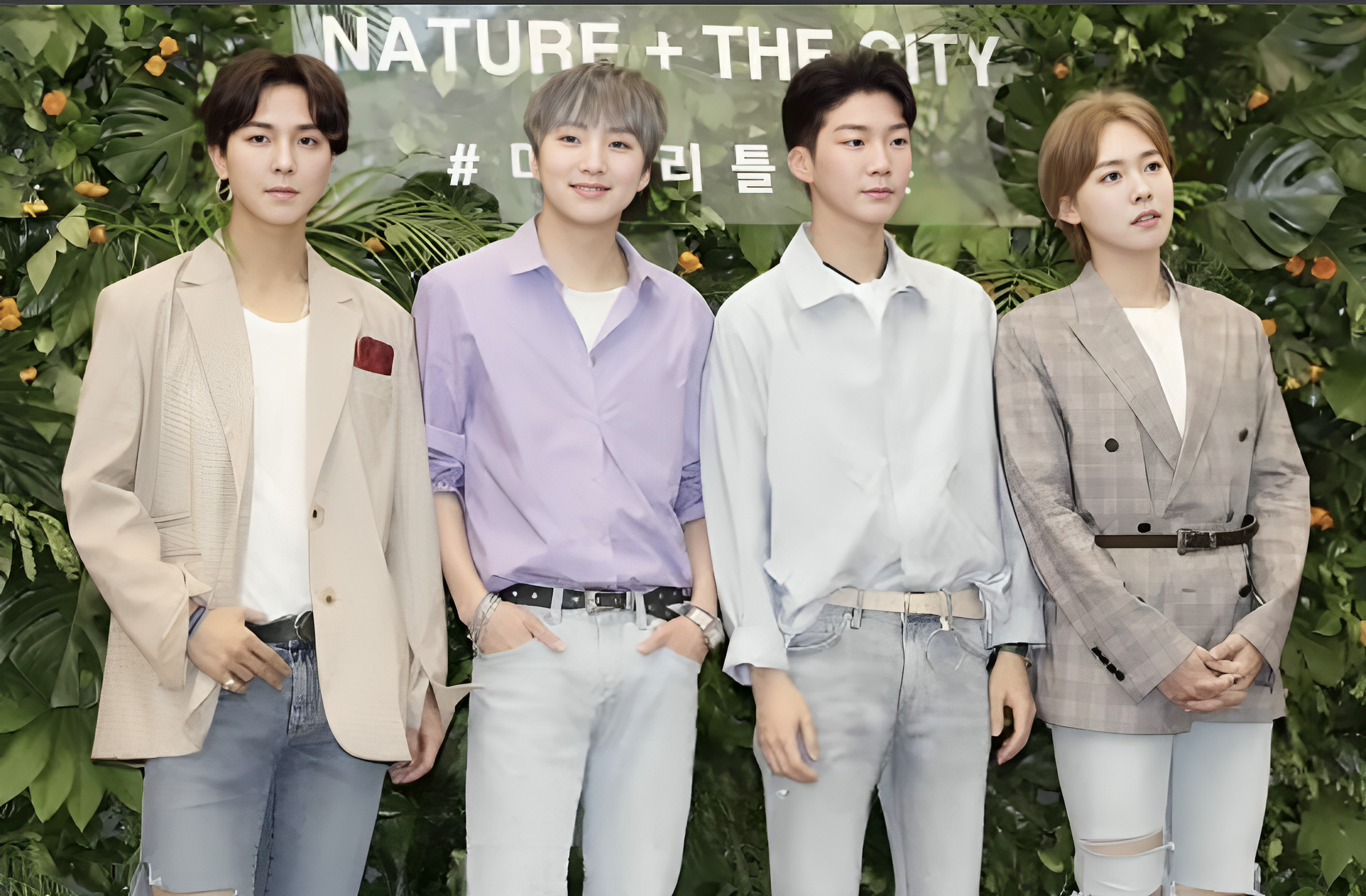
Winner attending Kiehl's Nature + The City Event in Gangnam on May 18, 2018

On February 7, 2018, Winner released their first Japanese studio album, Our Twenty For and embarked on their third Japan tour, "We'll Always Be Young". On April 4, Winner released their second studio album Everyday with a lead single of the same name. The album includes Korean versions of "Raining" and "Have a Good Day".

On December 19, Winner returned with the single album Millions; its title track reached number two on Gaon.

On May 15, 2019, Winner released their second extended play (EP), We, along with the lead single "Ah Yeah." During this comeback, the group achieved a triple crown on Gaon Chart: "Ah Yeah" peaked at number one on the Gaon Download Chart and number two on the Digital Chart, while the EP reached number one on the Album Chart, selling over 129,000 physical copies.

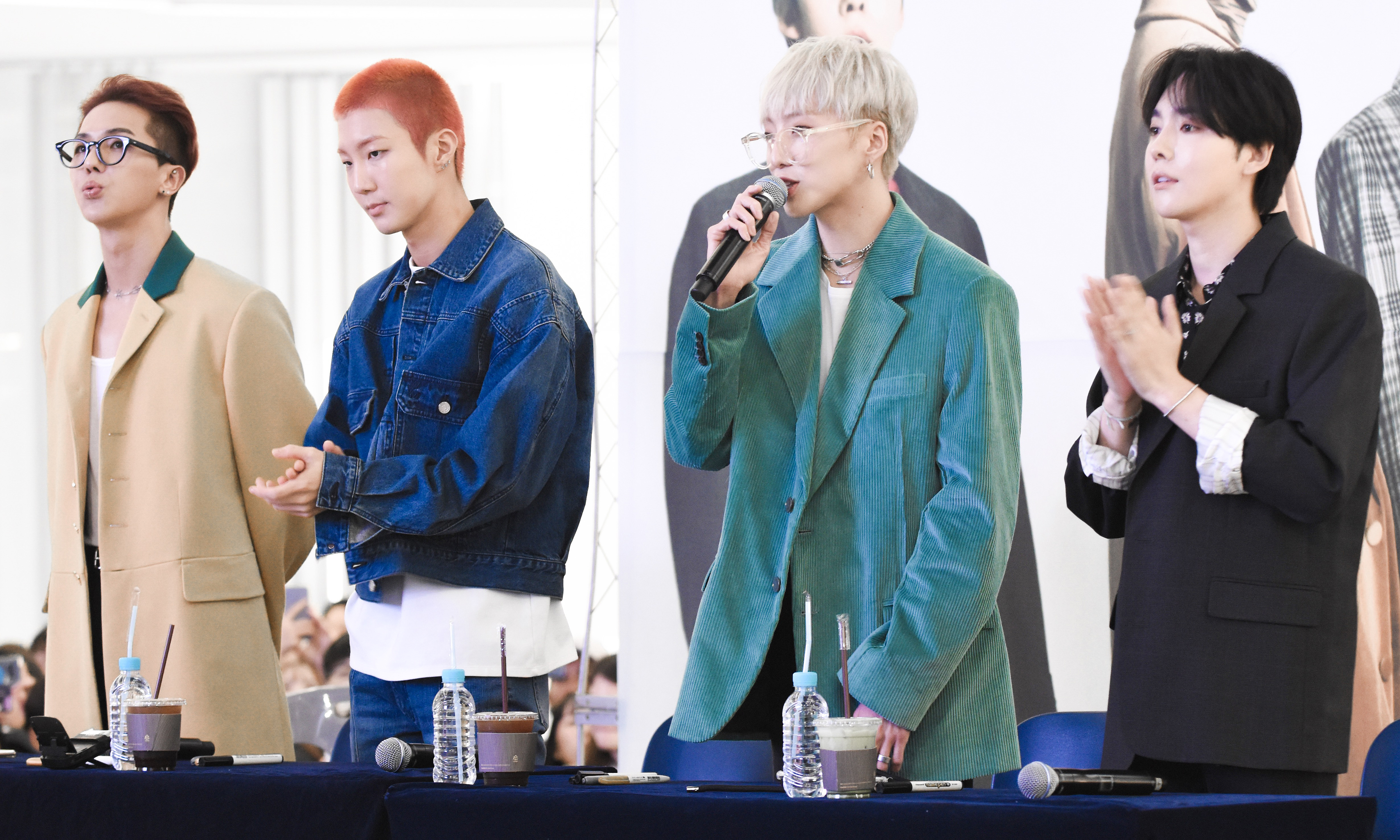
Winner at a fan signing event in Yeongdeungpo on November 2, 2019

Winner released their third EP Cross with the lead single "Soso" on October 23. Their Asian tour, the "Cross Tour," began in Seoul on October 26. However, due to the COVID-19 pandemic, the group's scheduled stop in Singapore was cancelled, followed by the cancellation of their Seoul encore concert. In response to this, Winner held a free online concert, "Winner Cross Special Live" on Naver V Live on February 14, 2020.

=== 2020–present: Military enlistment and releases ===
For Winner's third full-length album, Remember, a pre-release digital single entitled "Hold" (뜸) was released on March 26, 2020. It charted number one on several music streaming platforms, including Naver, Bugs, and Soribada. Its accompanying music video stars (now former) labelmate Lee Su-hyun of AKMU. Released on April 9, Remember contained eight tracks, including a lead single of the same name, the pre-release single "Hold" (뜸), and four re-recorded singles from their debut album, 2014 S/S. The album earned the group their highest first-week sales since their debut.

In August 2021, following the end of Winner's seven-year contract with YG Entertainment, the members renewed their contracts for five more years. On February 18, 2022, YG Entertainment announced the band's first concert in two years, which was held at the KSPO Dome in Seoul on April 30 and May 1. Winner returned on July 5, 2022, with their fourth EP Holiday and its lead single "I Love U". On December 11, 2022, YG Entertainment announced that Winner would hold an online concert "Winner Live Stage [White Holiday]" on December 29, 2022.

On April 2, 2020, Kim Jin-woo enlisted for Korean mandatory military service. As a result, the group's activities were paused indefinitely. Two weeks later, Lee Seung-hoon became the second member to enlist on April 16, 2020. Kim and Lee were discharged from their duties on December 31, 2021, and January 15, 2022, respectively. On March 2, 2023, YG Entertainment announced that Mino would enlist on March 24, 2023, and serve as a social worker. On May 24, 2023, YG Entertainment further announced that Kang Seung-yoon would enlist on June 20, 2023, as an active duty soldier. Both Mino and Kang were discharged in December 2024.

== Artistry ==
=== Musicality and self-production ===
"Smile Again" (2013)
"Smile Again" is a dance song showcasing synth sounds and rhythmic rapping. It combines elements of EDM with the theme of hope.

"Empty" (2014)
"Empty", from 2014 S/S, is a mid-tempo fusion of Hip hop and R&B with lyrical acoustic guitar riffs.

"Really Really" (2017)
"Really Really", from Fate Number For, is an upbeat tropical house song with a cheerful rhythm.

Winner's discography spans multiple genres. Their debut album 2014 S/S, highlighted several genres, including hip hop, ballad, reggae, dance, and R&B.

Their self-written material focuses on themes of love, hope, everyday life stories, and consolation. Kang Seung-yoon, who oversees the band's overall production, is often cited as their producer. In an interview with Vice, Kang said, "We incorporate our honest feelings and thoughts—the depth of it [is different] if someone else makes your song for you, versus being involved yourself as a writer [...] we've been putting ourselves into it." This approach is reflected across their catalogue: releases such as "Air" (2018), "Millions" (2018), and "I Love U" (2022), were inspired by exchanges with fans, while "Sentimental" and "Baby Baby" (2016) drew "analog emotions" from artists like The Rolling Stones, Kim Hyun-sik, and Yoo Jae-ha. Their 2019 single, "Ah Yeah" (2019), was inspired by the film Very Ordinary Couple (2013).

Member Lee Seung-hoon choreographed their lead debut singles, "Empty" and "Color Ring" (2014), as well as "Fool" (2017).

=== Image and artistic stylings ===
Winner has described their artistic style as more emotional and muted as compared to the extravagant aesthetics of other idol groups, although their music has since transitioned to a hybrid of trap and pop-esque beats commonly used in K-pop.

== Impact and influence ==
For university festival season in Korea, Mersenne, a company that casts artists, disclosed Winner were the primarily requested male idol group alongside iKon in 2018. In April 2019, five companies that worked on university festival casting, Mersenne, Innobay, 2M, Waikiki, and Top Plan, stated Winner was the only male idol group sought out that year. Other artists have cited Winner as a role model or influence, including Tag and Hong Joo-chan of Golden Child, A.C.E's Dong-hun, JBJ's Jin Longguo, Signal, Yongha of WEi, and MustB.

== Other ventures ==
=== Endorsements ===
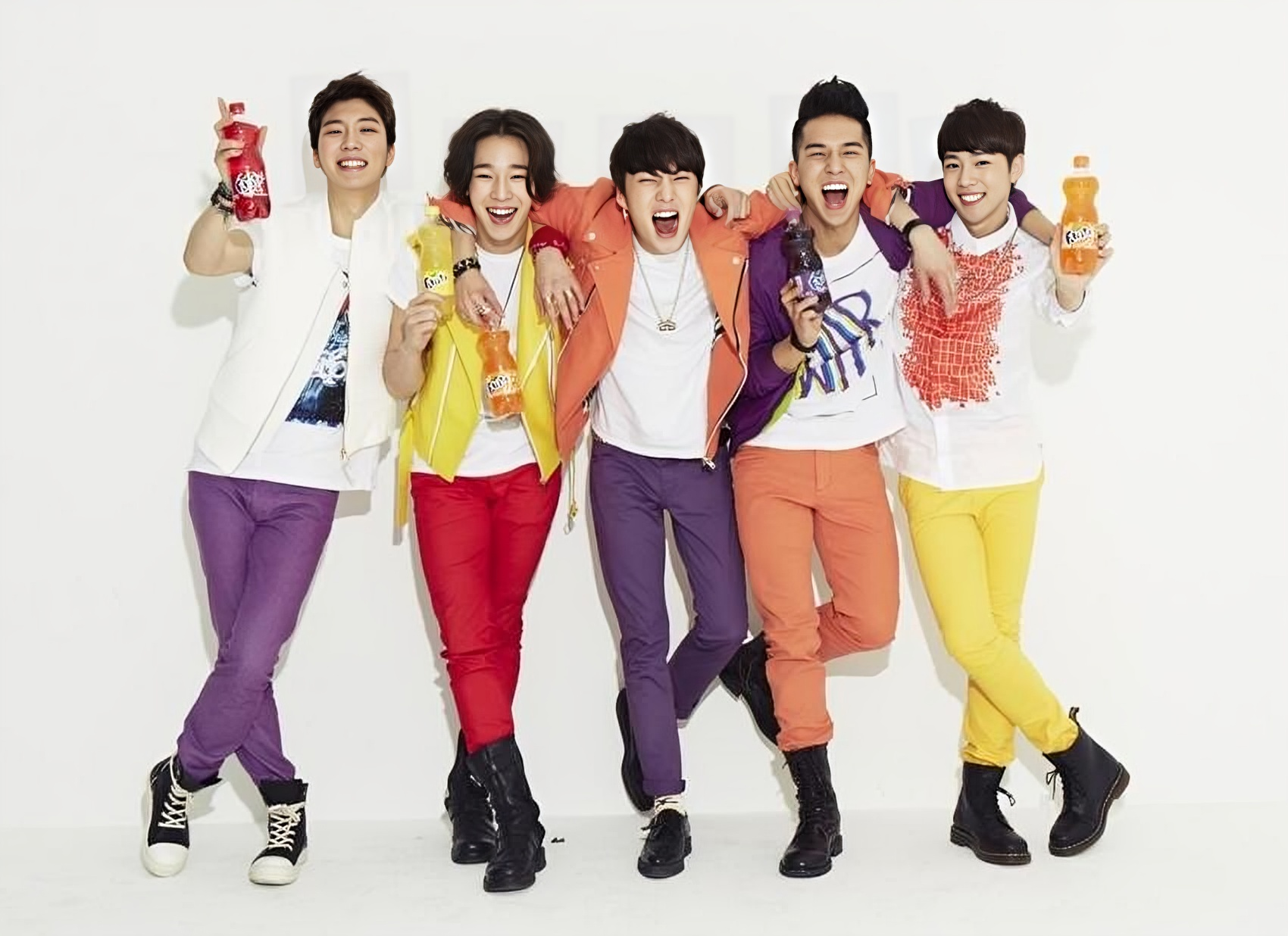
Winner for Fanta in 2014.

Winner has worked with brands: NII, Fanta, Adidas, Elite, Pizza Etang, Ellesse, Café DropTop, Oreo, and De Medicotem. They have also participated in promotional campaigns for 8Seconds, Calvin Klein, the Korean Culture and Information Service (KOCIS), and Kiehl's, and collaborated with the mobile gaming platform, Dancevil.

In 2016, Winner was cited as the most memorable school uniform commercial endorser of the year for their work with Elite. In 2017, Ellesse generated ₩14 billion for their year-end sales. According to Newsis, the co-branded 8Seconds x Winner 'Good Luck Padding' jacket sold over 6,000 units within two weeks of its release. In 2018, Talk Talk Korea garnered its most participants in its history since its launch in 2014.

=== Philanthropy ===
The charitable organizations that Winner has contributed to include: Mapo District Office, Korea Animal Rights Advocates (KARA), Cheolsan Social Welfare Center, Seoul Food Bank, and Coal Bank. At their fan meeting "WWIC 2018", they worked with the band's fan club to supply shipments of food to youth protection facilities, single mothers, and the elderly. The band has also donated profits attained through merchandise sales to KARA. Winner has donated goods to several charity events, including the "Creating a Better World With Stars" in 2014, where proceeds were donated to Good Neighbors, a humanitarian organization that helps single mothers and child welfare, "Made In Heaven" in 2019, organized by Sean of Jinusean and his wife, Jung Hye-young, where profits were used to cover the care expenses of 100 children, the "SAC Pet Festival" bazaar, and "Flower Response (花答)" in 2020, held by Big Bang's Taeyang, where proceeds were donated to Love Snail Charity, a social welfare organization dedicated to help provide cochlear implants and hearing aids to those in need.

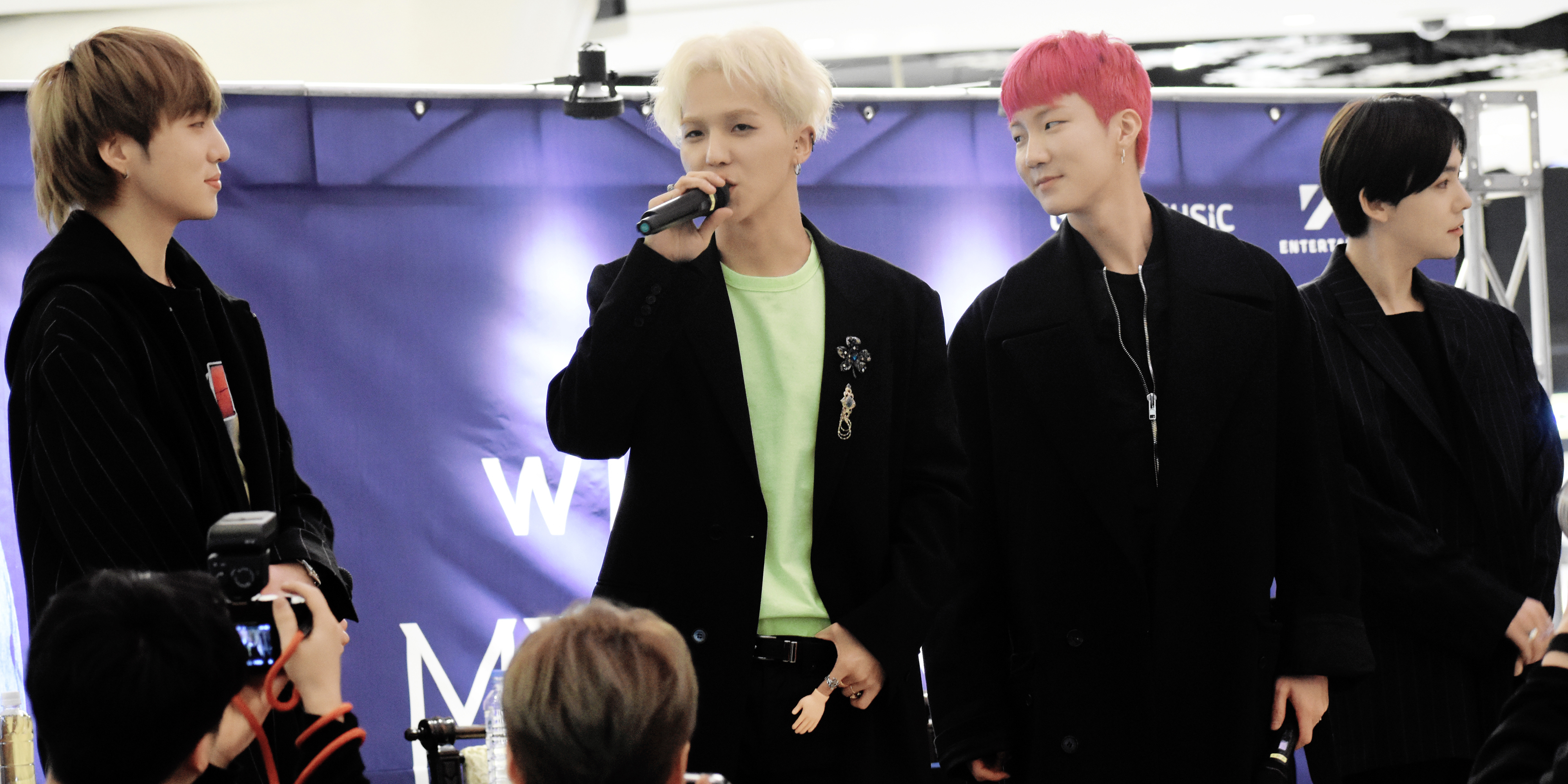
Winner attending a fansign event in Jamsil on December 29, 2018

The band collaborated with photographer Choi Se-hon on the 2014 project "The Letter from Angels", alongside Kangnam, Lee Kwang-soo, Yoo Yeon-seok, and Lee Seo-jin, to promote local adoption. They also partnered with a clothing brand NII and photo studio "Thank You Studio" for the animal campaign "Happiness," which donated all proceeds to People for the Ethical Treatment of Animals (PETA), and the charity event YG X UNICEF Walking Festival in 2017, which garnered 5,000 participants, where all profits were donated to the Korean Committee of UNICEF to treat children and adolescents with malnutrition.

== Ambassadorship ==
- Korea Brand & Entertainment EXPO by KOTRA (2016 / 2019)
- Korean Culture and Information Service (KOCIS) (2018)
- Paradise City Brand / PR Ambassador (2018)
- Crocs Brand Ambassador (2022)
- Hanoi Ambassador Hallyu Expo (2022)

== Discography ==
- 2014 S/S (2014)
- Everyday (2018)
- Remember (2020)

== Filmography ==
- WIN: Who Is Next (2013, Mnet)
- Winner TV (2013–14, Mnet)
- Half-Moon Friends (2016, JTBC)
- Youth Over Flowers (2017, tvN)
- YG Future Strategy Office (2018, Netflix) (Note: Cameo in Episode 02)
- Winner Vacation - Hoony Tour (2019, Olleh TV)
- W-Log (2019, YouTube)
- Bingo Trip (2019, Ditto Music)
- Winner Vacation - Bell Boys (2021, Seezn)
- Real Now-Winner Edition (2022, Naver Now)
- Artist Way (2022, JTBC)

== Concerts and tours ==
Headlining tours

- Zepp Tour in Japan (2014)
- Japan Tour (2015)
- Exit Tour (2016)
- Japan Tour 2018 ~We'll always be young~ (2018)
- Everywhere World Tour (2018–19)
- Winner Japan Tour (2019)
- Cross Tour (2019–20)

Concerts

- Winner 2022 Concert (2022)

Joint tours

- YG Family – Power World Tour (2014)

Opening act / guest performer

- Big Bang – Japan Dome Tour (2013–14)
- 2NE1 – All Or Nothing World Tour (2014)
