= We (Winner EP) =

- Digital cover

EP by Winner
- Released: May 15, 2019
- Recorded: 2018–2019
- Genres: Electro house; EDM; dance
- Length: 20:50
- Labels: YG; YGEX
- Producers: Airplay; Diggy; Kang Uk-jin; Seungyoon

Winner chronology
Everyday (2018)	We (2019)	Cross (2019)

Singles from We
- 1. "Ah Yeah" Released: May 15, 2019

Music video
- "Ah Yeah" on YouTube

We is the second extended play by South Korean boy group Winner, released on May 15, 2019 under the label YG Entertainment. This marks their first extended play release since Exit : E in February 2016. The EP features the lead single "Ah Yeah (아예)". The physical release comes in four versions: Black, Silver, Blue, and White.

== Promotion ==
YG Entertainment began promoting the EP on May 1 with a mysterious coming soon poster indicating comeback. On May 3, the date of the comeback was unveiled, followed by the EP title on May 7 and the lead single title on May 9. An hour prior of release, a live countdown special was broadcast on Naver Vlive. On May 18, Winner made their first music show appearance for their comeback on MBC's Show! Music Core, following appearance on SBS' Inkigayo the next day. On May 28, Winner appeared as guests on JTBC's Idol Room.

== Commercial performance ==
Upon release, the lead single "Ah Yeah (아예)" charted at number one on all South Korean charts, including Melon, Genie and Mnet. The EP We debuted at number one on the Gaon Albums Chart, selling up to 119,000 copies within the first two weeks of release. On China music platforms including QQ Music and Kugou, the EP sold over 120,000 copies within the first week of release. The lead single received its first music show win on Mnet's MCountdown on May 23, 2019.

== Track listing ==
No.	Title	Lyrics	Music	Arrangement	Length
1.	"Ah Yeah" (아예; aye)	Kang Seung-yoon; Song Min-ho; Lee Seung-hoon	Seung-yoon; Kang Uk-jin; Diggy; Joe Rhee	Uk-jin; Diggy	2:57
2.	"Zoo" (동물의왕국; dongmul-uiwang-gug)	Min-ho; Seung-hoon	Min-ho; Uk-jin; Diggy	Uk-jin; Diggy	3:33
3.	"Mola" (몰라도너무몰라; molladoneomumolla)	Min-ho; Seung-hoon	Seung-yoon; Uk-jin; Diggy	Uk-jin; Diggy	3:54
4.	"Boom"	Seung-yoon; Min-ho; Seung-hoon	Seung-yoon; Airplay	Airplay	3:25

Bonus tracks
No.	Title	Lyrics	Music	Arrangement	Length
5.	"Everyday" (remix)	Seung-yoon; Min-ho; Seung-hoon	Seung-yoon; Airplay; Min-ho	Future Bounce	3:21
6.	"First Love" (2019) (첫사랑; cheos-salang)	Jeon Hae-seong; Min-ho; Seung-hoon	Hae-seong	Airplay; Yoon	3:35

== Charts ==
Chart (2019)	Peak position
French Digital Albums (SNEP)	109
Japanese Albums (Oricon)	4
South Korean Albums (Gaon)	1
US World Albums (Billboard)	6

Ah Yeah music programs wins
Program	Date
M Countdown (Mnet)	May 23, 2019

== Release history ==
Release history for We
Country	Date	Version	Format	Label	Ref.
Various	May 15, 2019	Korean	Digital download; streaming	YG	
South Korea	May 17, 2019	Korean	CD	YG	
Various	July 1, 2019	Japanese	Digital download; streaming	YGEX	
Japan	August 7, 2019	Japanese	CD; DVD	YGEX	
