= Our Twenty For =

- Digital cover

Single album by Winner
- Released: August 4, 2017
- Recorded: 2016–17
- Genre: Disco funk; tropical house; dancehall
- Length: 14:08
- Language: Korean; Japanese
- Label: YG; KT Music; YGEX
- Producer: Winner

Winner chronology
Fate Number For (2017)	Our Twenty For (2017)	Everyday (2018)

Singles from Our Twenty For
- 1. "Love Me Love Me" / "Island" Released: August 4, 2017

Our Twenty For is the second single album by South Korean boy group Winner. It's their second comeback in 2017, after releasing their first single album Fate Number For in April, and the second in a series of music releases related to the number four. The single symbolizes Winner's youth, passion, and special friendship. It also symbolizes the average age of Winner members at 24 and their youth.

== Background ==
On July 14, Winner's agency, YG Entertainment, confirmed that the group will return with new music, either in late July or early August, with music videos being filmed overseas in Hawaii, United States. On July 24, the agency confirmed the date of their comeback to be August 4 and the title of the single album "Our Twenty For". In the following days, they announced the two singles "Love Me Love Me" and "Island", which was written and produced by the group members with the help of YG producers Future Bounce and Bekuh BOOM.

== Composition ==
"Love Me Love Me" is a disco song with a catchy hook, while "Island" is a tropical house track, which talks about romantic feelings with the unique theme of "island" and interesting lyrics.

== Track listing ==
Digital download
No.	Title	Lyrics	Music	Arrangement	Length
1.	"Love Me Love Me"	Kang Seung-yoon; Song Min-ho; Lee Seung-hoon	Seung-yoon; Min-ho; Future Bounce	Future Bounce	3:37
2.	"Island"	Seung-yoon; Min-ho; Seung-hoon; Rebecca Johnson	Future Bounce; Johnson; Seung-yoon	Future Bounce	3:27
Total length:					7:04

Our Twenty For – iTunes EP
No.	Title	Music	Arrangement	Length
3.	"Love Me Love Me" (instrumental)	Seung-yoon; Min-ho; Future Bounce	Future Bounce	3:37
4.	"Island" (instrumental)	Future Bounce; Johnson; Seung-yoon	Future Bounce	3:27
Total length:				14:08

== Charts ==
Chart (2017)	Peak position
South Korean Albums (Circle)	3

== Release history ==
Region	Date	Format	Label	Ref
Worldwide	August 4, 2017	Digital download; streaming	YG	
South Korea	August 8, 2017	CD	YG; KT Music	
Japan	August 12, 2017	Digital download; streaming	YGEX	
