= Cross (EP) =

- Digital cover

EP by Winner
- Released: October 23, 2019
- Recorded: 2019
- Genres: Dance; hip hop; alternative hip hop; R&B; synth-pop
- Length: 19:25
- Language: Korean
- Label: YG
- Producers: Airplay; Diggy; Future Bounce; Hoyas; Kang Uk-jin

Winner chronology
We (2019)	Cross (2019)	Remember (2020)

Singles from Cross
- 1. "Soso" Released: October 23, 2019

Cross is the third extended play by South Korean boy group Winner, released on October 23, 2019 under the label YG Entertainment. The EP features the lead single "Soso". The physical album comes in two versions: Crosslight and Crossroad.

== Promotion ==
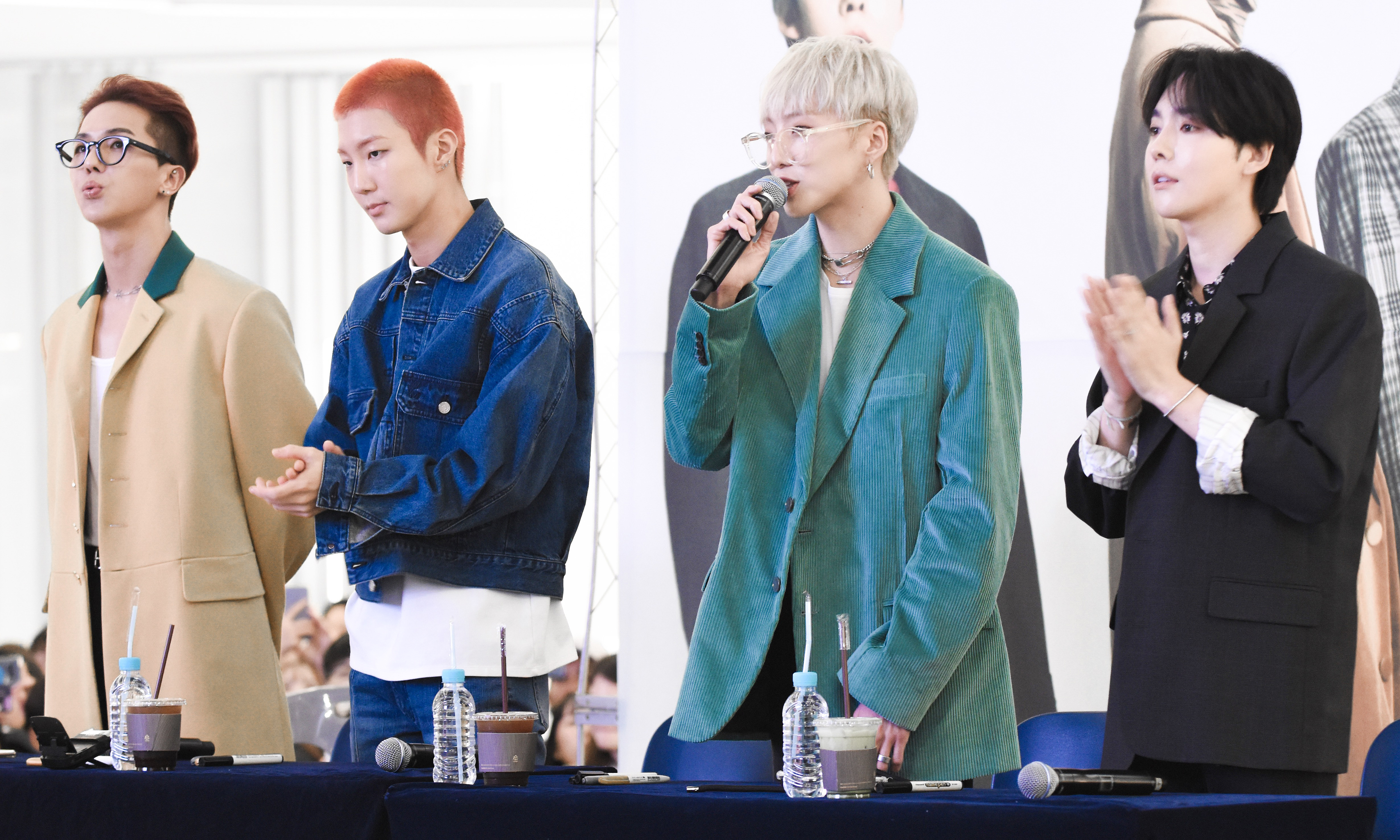
Winner during a Cross album signing event at Times Square, November 2019

On October 7, Winner uploaded a poster to their official Instagram account indicating an upcoming album release. On October 10, the release date and title were unveiled. On October 14, the track list and title track "Soso" were revealed.

== Track listing ==
No.	Title	Lyrics	Music	Arrangement	Length
1.	"Soso"	Kang Seung-yoon; Song Min-ho; Lee Seung-hoon	Seung-yoon; Airplay	Airplay	3:19
2.	"OMG"	Seung-yoon; Min-ho; Seung-hoon	Seung-yoon; Airplay	Airplay	3:36
3.	"Dress Up" (빼입어; ppaeib-eo)	Seung-yoon; Min-ho; Seung-hoon	Seung-hoon; Airplay	Airplay	3:19
4.	"Flamenco" (solo performed by Hoony)	Seung-hoon	Seung-hoon; Kang Uk-jin; Diggy	Uk-jin; Diggy	3:10
5.	"Wind" (바람; balam; solo performed by Yoon)	Seung-yoon	Seung-yoon; Uk-jin; Diggy; Hoyas	Hoyas; Diggy; Uk-jin	2:48
6.	"Don't Be Shy" (끄덕끄덕; kkeudeogkkeudeog)	Min-ho; Seung-hoon	Min-ho; Future Bounce	Future Bounce	3:18

== Charts ==
Chart (2019)	Peak position
French Digital Albums (SNEP)	128
South Korean Albums (Gaon)	4
US World Albums (Billboard)	12

== Release history ==
Release history for Cross
Region	Date	Format	Label	Ref
Various	October 23, 2019	Digital download; streaming	YG; YGEX	
South Korea	October 29, 2019	CD	YG; YG Plus	—
