= Nam Tae-hyun =

South Korean singer (born 1994)

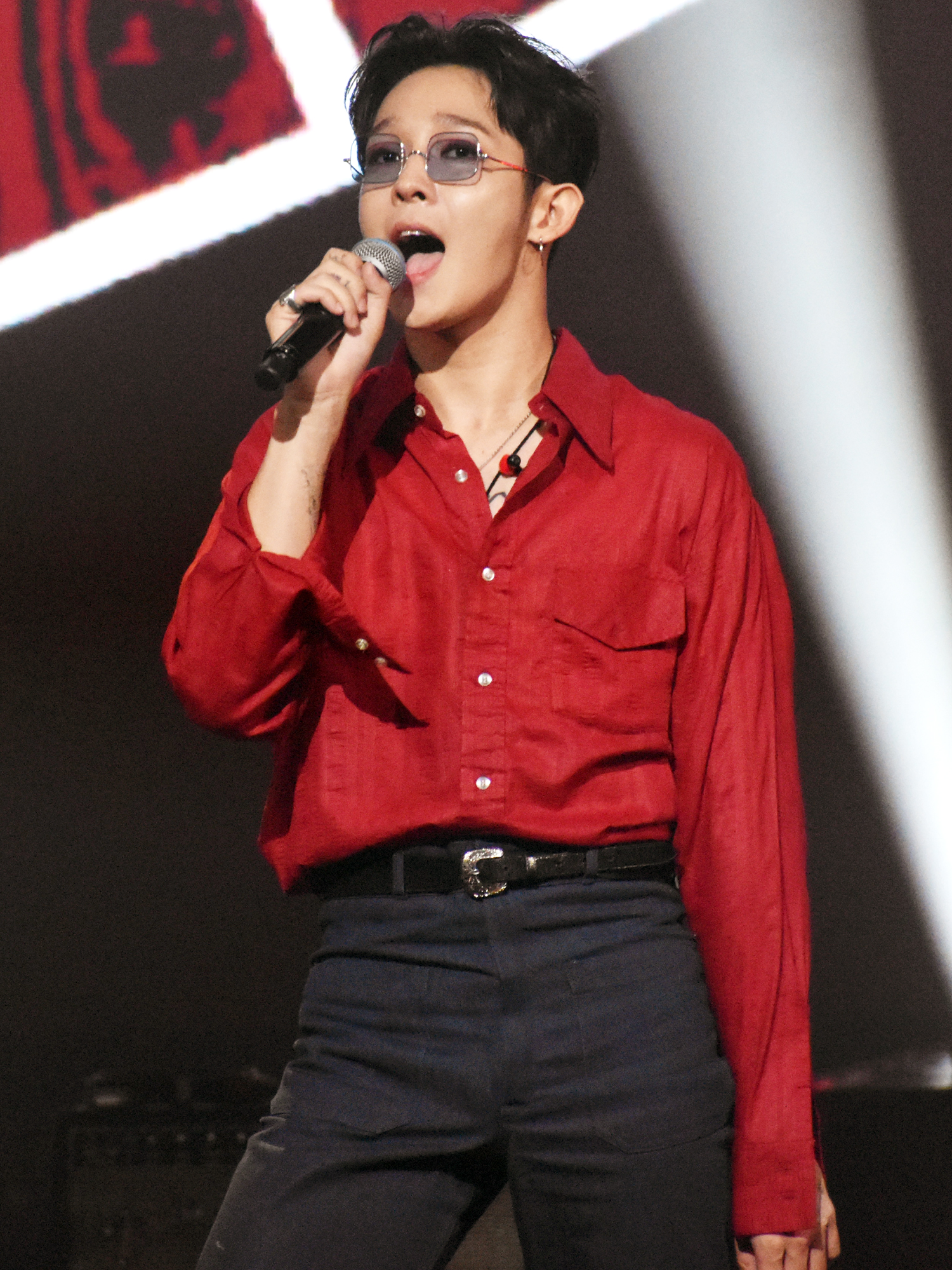
- Nam performing at the 2018 Indiestance Final Concert

Background information
- Born: May 10, 1994 (age 32); Hanam, South Korea
- Genres: Alternative rock; blues; deep house; K-pop
- Occupations: Singer; songwriter; record producer; radio DJ; actor
- Instruments: Vocals; guitar; bass; piano; drums
- Years active: 2014–present
- Labels: YG; South Buyers Club; Team NTH
- Member of: South Club
- Formerly of: Winner; YG Family

Korean name
- Hangul: 남태현
- Hanja: 南太鉉
- RR: Nam Taehyeon
- MR: Nam T'aehyŏn

Nam Tae-hyun (Korean: 남태현; born May 10, 1994), also known as Taehyun, is a South Korean singer, songwriter, producer and actor. He was previously the main vocalist of K-pop group Winner, in which he also composed and produced. In March 2017, he founded a music label, South Buyers Club. Sometime afterwards, the label was renamed to The South. Under the label, Nam debuted the band South Club, of which he is leader, main vocalist, guitarist, and main composer. As of 2024, he transitioned into a solo artist, with his returning single 'On the Edge of the Night.'

== Life and career ==
=== Pre-debut: Win: Who Is Next ===
Prior to his debut as a member of Winner, Nam performed as a backup dancer for the YG Family Concert 2011.

In 2013, he competed in the reality program Win: Who Is Next as a trainee in "Team A", which he went on to debut as a member of group Winner. Nam co-composed and co-wrote two songs that were used to compete on the show.

=== 2014–2015: Official debut, 2014 S/S, and television appearances ===
Nam participated in the production of Winner's debut album, 2014 S/S, which was released in August 2014. He co-composed three songs from the album – "But" (사랑하지마), "Tonight" (이 밤) and his solo track "Confession" (고백하는거야). The album topped several charts, including the Gaon Music Chart as well as the Billboard's World Albums Chart.

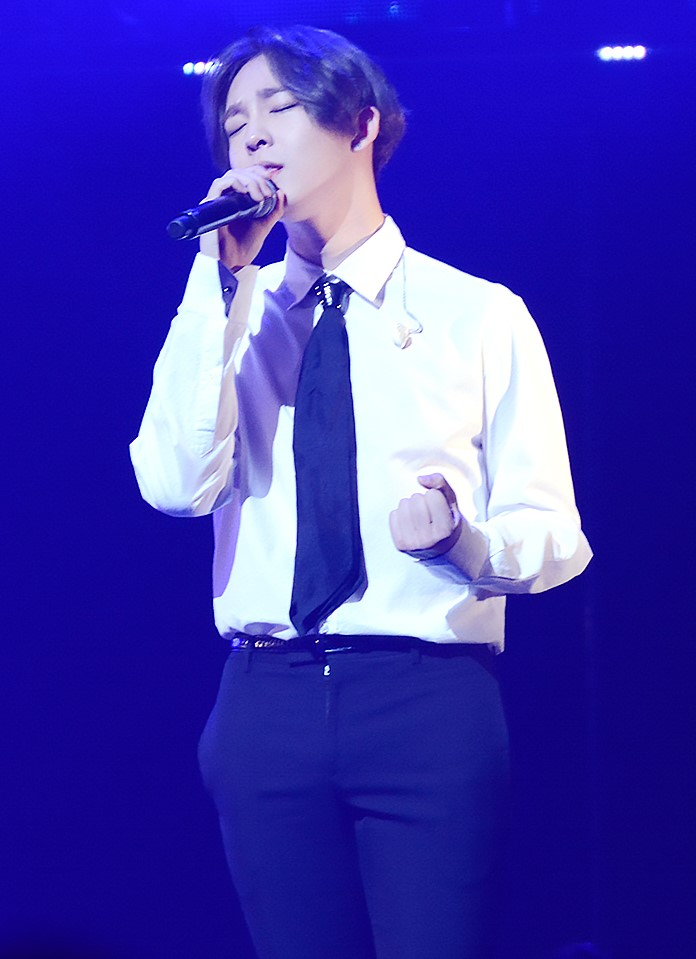
Nam at Winner Japan Tour 2015 in Aichi

In 2015, while the group was on hiatus, Nam made his acting debut on web drama Midnight Girl. That same year, he played a supporting role in the drama Late Night Restaurant. He was also cast in the joint Chinese-Korean production Under the Black Moonlight.

=== 2016: Exit : E, television appearances, and departure from Winner ===
In January 2016, Nam released the single "Pricked" (사랑가시) in collaboration with Mino as a warm-up track ahead of Winner's EP Exit : E. The single charted at number two on MelOn.

After nearly 18 months of hiatus, Winner's comeback mini-album Exit : E was released on February 1. The album featured five tracks, including "Pricked", and double title tracks "Baby Baby" and "센치해 (Sentimental)". Nam played a major role in the production of both title tracks, as well as for his solo "좋더라 (I'm Young)".

In March 2016, Nam joined tvN's Actor School, a variety show featuring seven stars going through a series of trainings by actor Park Shin-yang, in order to brush up on their acting skills.

On October 12, YG Entertainment stated that Nam would be halting promotional activities and receiving treatment for mental health issues. As a result, Winner's comeback was delayed indefinitely. Later, on November 25, it was announced that he had withdrawn from the group and had terminated his contract with YG Entertainment. The following day, he posted a handwritten letter on his personal Instagram account containing his apology, gratitude to fans and pledge to return with other music and projects.

=== 2017–2022: Music creations and South Buyers Club ===
Nam continues sharing his music creations and covers on his SoundCloud account, including a cover of Radiohead's "Creep", Park Hyo-shin's "Beautiful Tomorrow", and "Breath" (숨). His influences arise from artists across many genres, such as Nirvana, The Beatles, The Rolling Stones, B.B. King, and Eric Clapton. He then created a Tumblr site on January 5, posting announcements and communicating with fans from time to time. On January 23, Nam started recruiting applications for his upcoming band.

On March 25, Nam, together with his rumored band, South Club, held a guerrilla show at Pet Sounds Bar in Korea. The 30-minute show was livestreamed on platforms such as Instagram, and popular China video-sharing platform Miaopai. South Club performed a total of four songs, including tracks from The Beatles and Foster the People. On April 11, Nam announced that his music label "South Buyers Club" has officially been registered as of March 30. On May 26, South Club released the music video for their first pre-release track "Hug Me," which was a ballad rock track.

South Club's first EP 90 was released on June 27, along with music videos for the two title tracks: "Liar" and "I got the Blues.". The name of the album was inspired by the expression of freedom of youths in the 90s. It was also due to the fact that all members of the band were born after the year 1990. On July 9, the band came back with their first single titled "아니 (No)". After the member Yooni's departure, the band's first release as a four piece was the second single "누굴 위한 노래인가요 (Who Is This Song For?)", which became available for streaming on December 5, 2017.

Following their initial releases, South Club continued to produce music and expand their discography. Their second EP, titled "20", was released on June 28, 2018, followed by their third EP, "Contact Information", on October 24, 2018. The band's musical journey continued with the release of their single album "Twice (두 번)" on January 27, 2019. South Club further expanded their repertoire with singles such as "To My Friends" on March 18, 2020, and "Ride In" later on. Throughout their career, the band has consistently explored themes of youth, freedom, and personal experiences in their music, maintaining their alternative rock style with blues influences while continuing to release music and perform, adapting their sound and staying true to their rock roots.

=== 2024–present: Transition into a solo artist ===
In 2024, Nam Tae-hyun began to shift his focus towards a solo career. On December 23, 2024, he released a documentary on YouTube that featured a personal lecture he had prepared. This documentary chronicled his journey of recovery from drug addiction and shared the lessons he had learned along the way. The release of this deeply personal content marked a significant step in Nam's career, showcasing his growth as an artist and his willingness to address personal struggles publicly. Continuing his solo endeavors, Nam Tae-hyun released a new song titled "On the Edge of the Night" on January 17, 2025, along with a music video on his channel. The song received positive reactions for its emotional depth and introspective lyrics. This transition into more individual projects and the release of new solo material signaled a new direction for Nam Tae-hyun's artistic career as he moved into 2025.

=== Radio DJ ===
On July 31, 2017, Nam started his career as a radio DJ. He broadcast live on the Casper Radio Vlive channel on Mondays, at 11pm, to talk about various topics and to share his music with his fans. On his 32nd broadcast, on April 9, 2018, Nam announced that he would be doing his last broadcast on May 7, in order to focus more on his music.

== Personal life ==
External videos
- Nam Taehyun Answers Fan Questions About Mental Health, Rock Icons and South Club

Nam has been open about his struggles with bipolar disorder and depression. He stated in a November 2018 interview with Rolling Stone India that while founding his label South Buyers Club took a toll to his emotional wellbeing that he hadn't recovered from at the time, his daily effort to stay productive helped him "overcome his [feeling of] loneliness and depression". Later, he explained that "[w]hen I'm frustrated, I say that I'm frustrated—when I'm happy, I say that I'm happy." and that his approach of discussing his own mental state (and its positive influence on his fans) really isn't a "negative point of [his]" given that "[s]o many people struggle psychologically and that's just how people live".

Following the suicide of fellow K-pop idol and actress Sulli (former member of the girlgroup f(x)) in October 2019, Nam spoke out against cyberbullying and malicious commenting by netizens, stating that he had previously attempted suicide because of similar harassment.

== Production credits ==
Year	Artist	Song	Role	Album
2013	Team A	"Go Up"	Co-lyricist	Win: Who Is Next, "Final Battle"
2013	Team A	"Just Another Boy"	Co-lyricist	Win: Who Is Next, "Final Battle"
2014	Winner	"Confession" (고백하는거야)	Lyricist, co-composer	2014 S/S
2014	Winner	"But" (사랑하지마)	Co-lyricist, co-composer	2014 S/S
2014	Winner	"Tonight" (이 밤)	Co-lyricist, co-composer	2014 S/S
2016	Winner	"센치해 (Sentimental)"	Co-lyricist, co-composer	Exit : E
2016	Winner	"Baby Baby"	Co-lyricist, composer, co-arranger	Exit : E
2016	Winner	"좋더라 (I'm Young)"	Lyricist, co-composer	Exit : E

== Discography ==
=== Singles as a lead artist ===
Title	Year	Label	Album
"Confession" (고백하는 거야)	2014	YG	2014 S/S
"Pricked" (사랑가시) with Mino	2016	YG	EXIT E
"I'm Young" (좋더라)	2016	YG	EXIT E
"Take Me Out"	2017	—	Black OST
"Boy and girl (소년, 소녀)"	2017	—	Children of 20th Century OST
"별 (Star)"	2018	KTP Sound	Star
"Anyone"	2018	—	The Player OST Part.6
"Black"	2018	—	Space Part.1
"밤의 끝자락 위에서 (On the Edge of the Night)"	2025	Team NTH	On the Edge of the Night
"Rain"	2025	—	Non-album singles

=== Singles as a featured artist ===
Title	Year	Album
"Spoiler" (Japanese Mix) Epik High (featuring Taehyun of Winner)	2014	Shoebox Japan Edition

== Filmography ==
=== Television ===
==== Drama ====
Year	Title	Role
2015	Midnight's Girl	Gong Ji-dan
2015	Late Night Restaurant	Min-woo
2016	Under The Black Moonlight	Lee Kang-woo

==== Reality ====
Year	Title	Notes
2013	Win: Who Is Next	As a Team A member
2016	Actor School	Ep. 1-10
2016	Half-Moon Friends	As a teacher
2018	YG Future Strategy Office	Cameo (ep. 1)
2018	In-Law In Practice	as himself
2019	Studio Vibes	as himself

== Other ==
=== Radio ===
Year	Network	Program	Note
2017–2021	CaspermusicTV	Nam Taehyun's 11pm	DJ (every Monday)
