= Exit: E =

- Digital version cover.

EP by Winner
- Released: February 1, 2016
- Recorded: 2015
- Genre: Blues; R&B; indie pop; ballad
- Length: 18:10
- Language: Korean; Japanese
- Label: YG; YGEX
- Producer: Rovin; Taehyun

Winner chronology
| 2014 S/S (2014) | Exit: E (2016) | Fate Number For (2017) |

Westminster version
- Alternate "Westminster version" cover

Singles from Exit: E
- 1. "Pricked" Released: January 10, 2016; 2. "Baby Baby" / "Sentimental" / "I'm Young" Released: February 1, 2016

Exit: E is the first extended play by South Korean group Winner. It was released on February 1, 2016, 18 months after their debut album 2014 S/S back in 2014. As with their first album, the members contributed heavily to the songwriting and production aspects of Exit: E. The album was also Winner's last with member Nam Tae-hyun, who left the group on 25 November 2016.

The album physical sales sold over 64,000 copies in Korea.

== Background ==
"When we were making our first album in 2014, since each of us desired a different musical direction, there were many times when we disagreed with each other. In this upcoming album, we respected each other’s preferences and worked separately, silently and whenever there were satisfactory results, we immediately talked to each other about it. Because this process worked out smoothly, we rarely clashed." - Mino

The majority of the album was produced by the members themselves, much like in their full-length album 2014 S/S, though with limited contribution from leader Seungyoon. Member Taehyun was the main composer for both title tracks, "Baby Baby" and "Sentimental". Kang Uk-jin was a frequent presence in the album as well, who had previously helped Big Bang member Daesung with his second Japanese album D'slove. Frequent Sistar contributor lyricist and producer Rovin, assisted Taehyun with his solo single "I'm Young".

During the 18-month long hiatus, the members took the time to study more about music producing and songwriting in order to expand the variety in their sound. Jumping straight from the CJ E&M produced "Show Me The Money" rapping survival show, Min-ho expressed relief in being able to leave the 'intense' atmosphere behind..."[hiphop itself] is a scary type of music and it’s not like there is a rule that you need to do everything with strength but the program 'Show Me The Money' itself is an audition program where they make all the rappers compete with each other so it can’t be helped that there is a atmosphere that pressurizes the mentality." Going on to explain that the hiphop scene was somewhat restricting, he revealed that the members were more comfortable working together on Exit: E than on their previous album, where they had encountered disagreements stemming from different musical styles. Taehyun, meanwhile, listened to B. B. King, blues rock, and modern rock in order to expand his musical experience, and incorporated those styles in the songs he contributed to the album. He learned to play the guitar during the break as well.

== Packaging ==
The physical album was released the following day and came in two versions: "Alexandra Palace" and "Shoreditch". A limited physical edition, called "Westminster", was released on March 12, 2016.

== Composition ==
The album features five tracks, including the double title songs "Baby Baby" and “Sentimental”, Mino and Taehyun's duet “Pricked”; as well as a solo song "I'm Young" by Taehyun. "Baby Baby" was described to be a blues-infused song, and "Sentimental" a rhythmic minor pop track “Sentimental”.

== Cover projects ==
As a way to generate excitement for Winner's comeback, instead of simply releasing teasers, various artists covered "Sentimental" and "Baby Baby", the title tracks for the then upcoming extended play. 8 different renditions were made in total for the project series, featuring short video covers by DEAN, Epik High, G-Dragon, Katie Kim, Akdong Musician, Zion.T, Taeyang, and Lee Hi.

== Track listing ==
| No. | Title | Lyrics | Music | Arrangement | Length |
|---|---|---|---|---|---|
| 1. | "Baby Baby" | Nam Tae-hyun; Song Min-ho; Lee Seung-hoon | Tae-hyun | Taehyun; Kang Uk-jin | 4:06 |
| 2. | "Sentimental" (센치해; senchihae) | Tae-hyun; Min-ho; Seung-hoon | Tae-hyun; Uk-jin | Taehyun; Uk-jin | 3:28 |
| 3. | "Immature" (철없어; cheol-eobs-eo) | Kang Seung-yoon; Min-ho; Seung-hoon | Seung-yoon; Uk-jin | Uk-jin | 3:12 |
| 4. | "I'm Young" (좋더라; johdeola; solo performed by Taehyun) | Tae-hyun | Tae-hyun; Rovin | Rovin | 3:33 |
| 5. | "Pricked" (사랑가시; salang-gasi; duet performed by Mino and Taehyun) | Min-ho | Min-ho; Uk-jin | Uk-jin | 3:51 |
| Total length: | | | | | 18:10 |

== Commercial performance ==
Upon release, Exit: E was an immediate success with "Baby Baby" and "Sentimental" having topped eight charts including Melon, OllehMusic, Naver Music, Genie, Bugs, Soribada, Mnet.com, and Monkey3Music. The album was warmly received in various parts of Asia as well, where it climbed to the top of iTunes charts in 11 nations including Hong Kong, Indonesia, Macao, Malaysia and the Philippines. It has also ranked 17th on U.S. iTunes. It debuted at No. 2 on Billboard's World Albums Chart and at No. 3 on the Heatseekers Album chart.

== Charts ==
| Chart | Peak position |
|---|---|
| South Korea Gaon Weekly Album Chart | 1 |
| Japan Oricon Weekly Album Chart | 63 |
| United States Billboard Heatseekers Album Chart" | 3 |
| United States Billboard World Album Chart" | 2 |

Sentimental music programs wins
| Program | Date |
|---|---|
| MBC M's Show Champion | February 10, 2016 |
| M Countdown (Mnet) | February 25, 2016 |

== Sales ==
| Region | Sales |
|---|---|
| Japan | 4,321 |
| Korea | 87,553+ |

== Release history ==
Release history for Exit: E
| Region | Date | Version | Language | Format | Label | Ref |
|---|---|---|---|---|---|---|
| South Korea | February 1, 2016 | Standard | Korean | CD | YG | — |
| Various | February 1, 2016 | Standard | Korean | Digital download; streaming | YG | — |
| South Korea | March 12, 2016 | Westminster | Korean | CD | YG | — |
| Japan | June 15, 2016 | Japanese | Japanese | Digital download; streaming | YGEX | |
| Various | June 15, 2016 | Japanese | Japanese | Digital download; streaming | YGEX | |
