= 2014 S/S =

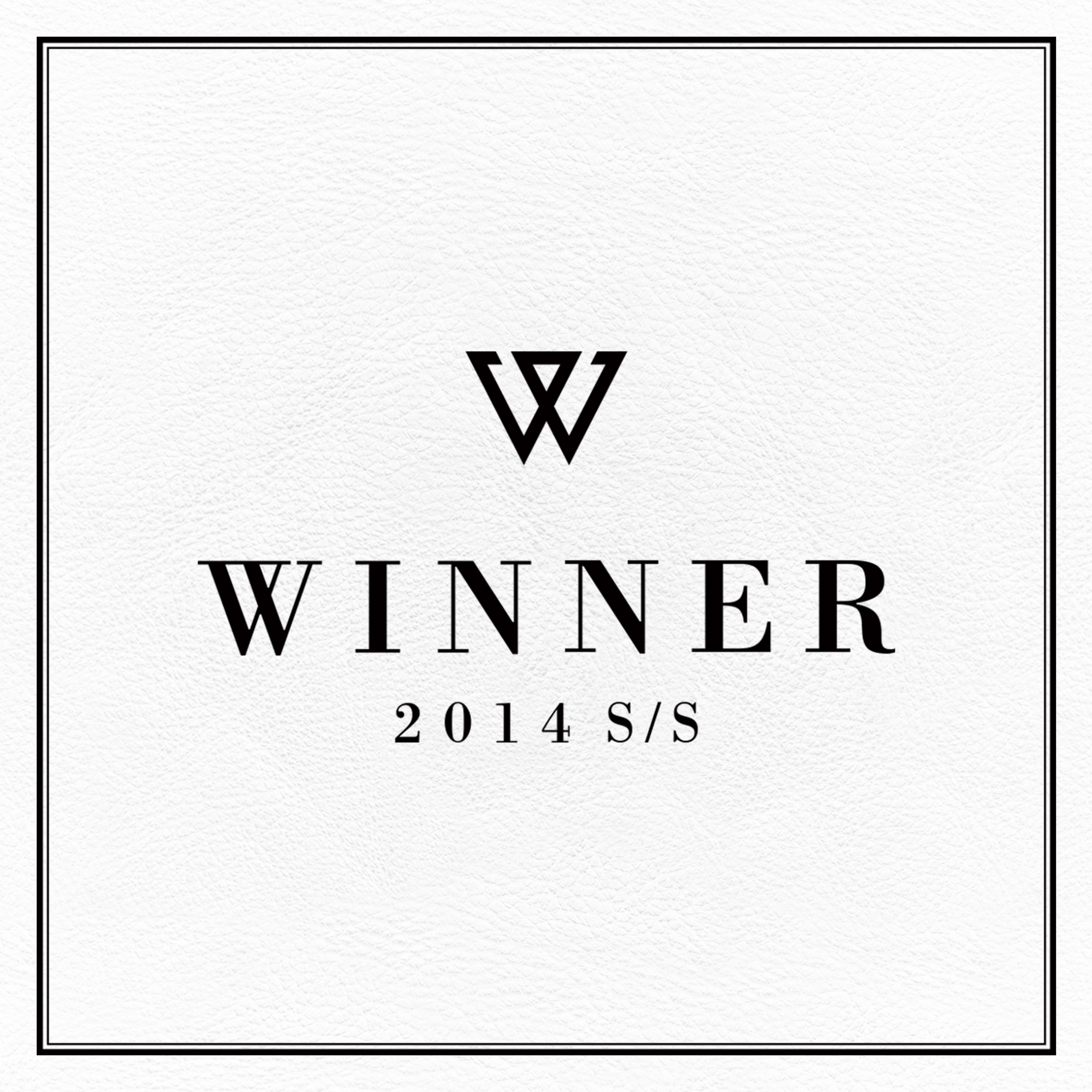
- Digital cover

Studio album by Winner
- Released: August 12, 2014
- Recorded: 2013–2014
- Genre: Sentimental ballad; K-pop; Reggae; Hip hop
- Length: 35:58
- Language: Korean
- Label: YG; KT Music
- Producer: Winner

Winner chronology
2014 S/S (2014)	Exit : E (2016)

Singles from 2014 S/S
- 1. "Empty" / "Color Ring" Released: August 12, 2014

2014 S/S is the debut album of South Korean group Winner. It was released on August 12, 2014, by the group's record label, YG Entertainment. The members were credited for writing the lyrics and composing the majority of the album's songs.

== Composition ==
The members produced the majority of the music for this album themselves, with the help of other producers such as Choice 37, B.I., Airplay, and others. The album was highlighted for incorporating elements generally absent from K-pop releases, including hints of acoustic and alternative rock.

== Track listing ==
No.	Title	Lyrics	Music	Arrangement	Length
1.	"Empty" (공허해; Gongheohae; It's empty)	Mino; B.I; Bobby	B.I; P.K	P.K	3:40
2.	"Color Ring" (컬러링; Keolleoring; Coloring)	Yoon; Mino; Hoony	Yoon; Ham Seung-cheon; Kang Uk-jin; iHwak; Dee.P	Ham Seung-cheon; Kang Uk-jin	3:55
3.	"Don't Flirt" (끼부리지마; Kkiburijima; Don't interrupt)	iHwak; Ham Seung-cheon; Kang Uk-jin; Mino; Hoony	Ham Seung-cheon; Kang Uk-jin; iHwak	Ham Seung-cheon; Kang Uk-jin	3:25
4.	"I'm Him" (걔 세; Gyae se; He's three (Mino solo))	Mino	Choice37; Mino; Teddy	Choice37; Teddy	2:52
5.	"Love is a Lie" (척; Cheok; Chuck)	Mino; Yoon	Yoon; The Fliptones	The Fliptones	3:23
6.	"Confession" (고백하는거야; Gobaekhaneungeoya; Confession (Taehyun solo))	Taehyun	Taehyun; Airplay; iHwak	Airplay	4:07
7.	"But" (사랑하지마; Saranghajima; Don't love)	Taehyun; Hoony; Mino	Taehyun; Ham Seung-cheon; Mino	Ham Seung-cheon; Kang Uk-jin	3:53
8.	"Different"	Yoon; Mino; Hoony	Mino; Yoon	Airplay	3:57
9.	"Tonight" (이 밤; I bam; This night)	Taehyun; Mino	Taehyun; Airplay	Airplay	3:22
10.	"Smile Again"	Yoon; Mino; Hoony	Yoon; Mino; Dee.P	The Fliptones	3:20
Total length:					35:58

== Reception ==
The title track "Empty" became a hit in South Korea, topping the Gaon Chart and Billboard's K-Pop Hot 100 chart, and topping 7 other South Korean charts. The album also found some success in China and Japan. Internationally, 2014 S/S took the top spot in Billboard's World Album Chart.

Empty music programs wins
Program	Date
M Countdown (Mnet)	August 21, 2014
M Countdown (Mnet)	August 28, 2014
M Countdown (Mnet)	September 18, 2014
KBS's Music Bank	August 22, 2014
SBS's Inkigayo	August 24, 2014
SBS's Inkigayo	August 31, 2014

== Charts ==
Chart	Peak position
South Korea Gaon Weekly Album Chart	1
United States Billboard World Album Chart"	1
United States Billboard Heatseekers Albums	6
South Korea Gaon Monthly Physical Album Chart	2
South Korea Gaon Yearly Physical Album Chart	25

=== Sales ===
Chart	2014	2015	2016	Total
Gaon Chart physical sales	80,262	9,578	3,057	92,897

== Release history ==
Release history for 2014 S/S
Region	Date	Format	Label
South Korea	August 12, 2014	CD	YG; KT
Various	August 12, 2014	Digital download; streaming	YG
