= Miaopai =

Chinese video sharing and live streaming service

- Developer: Yixia Tech
- Stable release: iOS 7.2.3 (January 25, 2019; 7 years ago) Android 7.1.61 (January 27, 2018; 8 years ago) [±]
- Operating system: Android, iOS
- Type: Video sharing
- Website: miaopai.com

Miaopai (Chinese: 秒拍) is a Chinese video sharing and live streaming service with 70 million daily active users.
