= List of songs written by Bobby =

Bobby is a South Korean rapper, singer-songwriter, and member of K-pop band iKon, signed under 143 Entertainment. As of October 2023, the Korea Music Copyright Association has 115 songs registered under his name. All song credits are adapted from the KOMCA's database, unless otherwise noted.

== iKon albums/singles ==
Year	Artist(s)	Album	Song	Lyrics		Music	
Year	Artist(s)	Album	Song	Credited	With	Credited	With
2013	Team B (Pre-debut)	Win Final Battle	**"Climax"**	Yes	B.I, Kim Jin-hwan, Koo Jun-hoe	No	B.I, Lydia Soo Paek, Choice37
2013	Team B (Pre-debut)	Win Final Battle	"Just Another Boy"	Yes	B.I, Teddy	No	B.I, Teddy
2014	Team B (Pre-debut)	Mix & Match	**"Wait For Me"**	Yes	B.I	No	B.I, Kang Uk-jin
2015	iKon	Welcome Back	"Welcome Back"	Yes	B.I	No	B.I, Rovin
2015	iKon	Welcome Back	**"Rhythm Ta"**	Yes	B.I	No	B.I, P.K, Koo Jun-hoe
2015	iKon	Welcome Back	"Rhythm Ta Remix" (Rock Ver.)	Yes	B.I	No	B.I, P.K, Koo Jun-hoe
2015	iKon	Welcome Back	**"My Type"**	Yes	B.I, Kush	No	B.I, Choice37, Kush
2015	iKon	Welcome Back	"Today"	Yes	B.I	No	B.I, Ham Seung-chun, Kang Uk-jin, Future Bounce
2015	iKon	Welcome Back	**"Airplane"**	Yes	B.I	No	B.I, Future Bounce
2015	iKon	Welcome Back	**"Dumb & Dumber"**	Yes	B.I	No	B.I, Future Bounce
2015	iKon	Welcome Back	**"What's Wrong?"**	Yes	B.I	No	B.I, Rovin
2015	iKon	Welcome Back	"I Miss You So Bad"	Yes	B.I, G-Dragon	No	G-Dragon, DEE.P
2015	B.I, Bobby	Welcome Back	**"Anthem"**	Yes	B.I	Yes	B.I, Teddy
2015	iKon	Welcome Back	**"Apology"**	Yes	B.I, Teddy, Kush	No	Teddy, Kush
2015	iKon	Welcome Back	"M.U.P"	Yes	B.I	No	B.I, The Fliptones, The Jackie Boyz
2016	iKon	Non-album single	**"#WYD"**	Yes	B.I, Kush	No	Choice37, Kush
2017	iKon	New Kids: Begin	**"Bling Bling"**	Yes	B.I, Millennium	No	B.I, Millennium
2017	iKon	New Kids: Begin	**"B-Day"**	Yes	B.I	No	B.I, Airplay, Kang Uk-jin
2018	iKon	Return	**"Love Scenario"**	Yes	B.I, Mot Mal	No	B.I, Millennium, Seung
2018	iKon	Return	"Beautiful"	Yes	B.I, Teddy	No	B.I, Choice37, Teddy
2018	iKon	Return	"Jerk"	Yes	B.I	No	B.I, Kang Uk-jin
2018	iKon	Return	"Everything"	Yes	B.I, Psy	No	B.I, Psy, Yoo Gun-hyung
2018	iKon	Return	"Hug Me"	Yes	B.I	No	B.I, Tablo
2018	iKon	Return	"Don't Forget"	Yes	B.I, Kim Joon	No	B.I, Kang Uk-jin, Diggy
2018	iKon	Return	"Sinosijak"	Yes	B.I	No	B.I, Kang Uk-jin
2018	iKon	Return	"Love Me"	Yes	B.I, Kush	No	B.I, Choice37, Kush, Koo Jun-hoe
2018	iKon	Return	"Long Time No See"	Yes	B.I	No	B.I, Choice37, Lydia Soo Paek, Taeyang
2018	iKon	The New Kids	**"Rubber Band"**	Yes	B.I, Mino, Seung	No	B.I, Mino, Millennium
2018	iKon	New Kids: Continue	"Freedom"	Yes	B.I, Seung	No	B.I, Millennium, Seung
2018	iKon	New Kids: Continue	"Only You"	Yes	B.I	No	B.I, Kang Uk-jin
2018	iKon	New Kids: Continue	"Cocktail"	Yes	B.I	No	B.I, Millennium
2018	iKon	New Kids: The Final	**"Goodbye Road"**	Yes	B.I	No	B.I, Future Bounce, Bekuh BOOM
2018	iKon	New Kids: The Final	"Adore You"	Yes	B.I	No	B.I, Seo Won-jin
2019	iKon	The New Kids	**"I'm OK"**	Yes	B.I, Kim Jong-won	No	B.I, Future Bounce
2020	iKon	I Decide	"Ah Yeah"	Yes	B.I	No	B.I, Millennium
2020	iKon	I Decide	"All The World"	Yes	B.I, Dustyy Han	No	B.I, Kang Uk-jin, Diggy
2020	iKon	I Decide	"Flower"	Yes	Kim Dong-hyuk (DK)	No	DK, iHwak, HRDR
2021	iKon	Non-album single	**"Why Why Why"**	Yes	Sonny, Lil G, Choice37, LP	Yes	LP, Choice37, Sonny, Lil G
2021	iKon	Kingdom: Legendary War	**"At Ease"**	Yes	Mino	No	Mino, Future Bounce
2022	iKon	Flashback	**"But You"**	Yes	Airplay, Kid Wine, Maribelle Anes	No	Kang Uk-jin, Diggy, Maribelle Anes
2022	iKon	Flashback	"Dragon"	Yes	—	Yes	The Proof, Millennium, Jay, DK, DEE.P
2022	iKon	Flashback	"For Real?"	Yes	DK	No	DK, Kang Uk-jin, Diggy, Lee Chang-woo
2022	iKon	Flashback	"Gold"	Yes	Yoon	No	Yoon, Kang Uk-jin, Diggy
2022	iKon	Flashback	"Name"	Yes	DK, Sonny, Se.A	No	DK, Kang Uk-jin, Diggy, Sonny
2022	iKon	Non-album single (Note: For iKon's Japan Tour 2022.)	"Your Voice"	Yes	DK	No	DK, Kang Uk-jin, Diggy
2023	iKon	Take Off	**"U"**	Yes	—	Yes	The Proof
2023	iKon	Take Off	**"Tantara"**	Yes	DK, MinorMilo	Yes	DK, MinorMilo
2023	iKon	Take Off	"Rum Pum Pum"	Yes	—	Yes	DK, The Proof, Millennium
2023	iKon	Take Off	"영화처럼"	Yes	Ju-ne	No	Ju-ne, Kang Uk-jin
2023	iKon	Take Off	"Driving Slowly"	Yes	—	Yes	The Proof
2023	iKon	Take Off	"잊어볼게"	Yes	DK	No	DK, Kang Uk-jin, Diggy
2023	iKon	Take Off	"여기까진가봐"	Yes	DK	No	DK, Kang Uk-jin, Diggy
**Bold** denotes title track.

== Solo works ==
Year	Artist(s)	Album	Song	Lyrics		Music	
Year	Artist(s)	Album	Song	Credited	With	Credited	With
2014	Bobby	Show Me the Money 3	"L4L (Lookin' For Luv)" (featuring Dok2, The Quiett)	Yes	Dok2, The Quiett	No	Dok2
2014	Bobby	Show Me the Money 3	"YGGR#hiphop"	Yes	Mc Meta, Double K, Dok2	No	Prima Vista, Dok2
2014	Bobby	Show Me the Money 3	"GO"	Yes	—N/a	No	Dok2
2014	Bobby	Show Me the Money 3	"Raise Your Guard and Bounce"	Yes	—N/a	Yes	Prima Vista
2015	Bobby	Show Me the Money 4	"King of the Youth"	Yes	—N/a	Yes	Millennium
2016	Bobby	The MOBB	**"HOLUP!"**	Yes	Schockbit, Kim Daniel Dong Hwa	Yes	Schockbit, Kim Daniel Dong Hwa
2016	MOBB	The MOBB	**"Full House"**	Yes	Mino	No	Teddy, Choice37
2016	MOBB	The MOBB	**"Hit Me"** (featuring Kush)	Yes	Mino, Kush	Yes	Mino, Kush, Choice37, Teddy, Seo Won Jin
2017	Bobby	Love and Fall	**"I Love You"**	Yes	—N/a	Yes	Kang Uk-jin, Diggy
2017	Bobby	Love and Fall	**"Runaway"**	Yes	—N/a	Yes	Choice37
2017	Bobby	Love and Fall	"Alien"	Yes	—N/a	Yes	Millennium
2017	Bobby	Love and Fall	"Tendae/ I Would"	Yes	—N/a	Yes	Millennium
2017	Bobby	Love and Fall	"Up" (featuring Mino)	Yes	Mino	Yes	Mino, Choice37
2017	Bobby	Love and Fall	"Secret" (featuring DK, Katie)	Yes	DK	Yes	Millennium
2017	Bobby	Love and Fall	"In Love"	Yes	—N/a	Yes	Choice37
2017	Bobby	Love and Fall	"Swim"	Yes	—N/a	Yes	Millennium
2017	Bobby	Love and Fall	"Firework"	Yes	—N/a	Yes	Kang Uk-jin
2017	Bobby	Love and Fall	"Lean on Me"	Yes	—N/a	Yes	Choice37
2019	Bobby, DK	—N/a (Note: For iKon's Japan Tour 2019.)	"Surf"	Yes	DK	Yes	DK, The Proof
2020	Bobby	—N/a (Note: For iKon-ON: Special gift for fans released on iKon's YouTube channel.)	"Rest your Bones"	Yes	—N/a	Yes	The Proof
2021	Bobby	Lucky Man	**"U Mad"**	Yes	—N/a	Yes	The Proof
2021	Bobby	Lucky Man	"Rockstar"	Yes	—N/a	Yes	HRDR
2021	Bobby	Lucky Man	"No Time"	Yes	—N/a	Yes	HRDR
2021	Bobby	Lucky Man	"Break it Down"	Yes	—N/a	Yes	Royal Dive
2021	Bobby	Lucky Man	"In the Dark"	Yes	—N/a	Yes	The Proof
2021	Bobby	Lucky Man	"Lilac"	Yes	—N/a	Yes	The Proof
2021	Bobby	Lucky Man	"Ur Soul Ur Body" (featuring DK)	Yes	—N/a	Yes	Kang Uk-jin, Diggy
2021	Bobby	Lucky Man	"Gorgeous"	Yes	—N/a	Yes	Royal Dive
2021	Bobby	Lucky Man	"Liar"	Yes	—N/a	Yes	The Proof
2021	Bobby	Lucky Man	"Heartbroken Playboy"	Yes	—N/a	Yes	Millennium, Diggy
2021	Bobby	Lucky Man	"Raining" (featuring Koo Jun-hoe)	Yes	—N/a	Yes	HRDR
2021	Bobby	Lucky Man	"Let it Go"	Yes	—N/a	Yes	The Proof
2021	Bobby	Lucky Man	"Devil"	Yes	—N/a	Yes	The Proof
2023	Bobby	S.i.R	**"Drowning"** (featuring Sole)	Yes	—N/a	Yes	The Proof
2023	Bobby	S.i.R	"Cherry Blossom"	Yes	—N/a	Yes	The Proof
**Bold** denotes title track.

== Other artists ==
Year	Artist(s)	Album	Song	Lyrics		Music	
Year	Artist(s)	Album	Song	Credited	With	Credited	With
2014	Winner	2014 S/S	**"Empty"**	Yes	B.I, Mino	No	B.I, P.K
2014	Epik High	Shoebox	**"Born Hater"** (featuring Beenzino, Verbal Jint, B.I, Mino, Bobby)	Yes	Tablo, Mithra Jin, Beenzino, Verbal Jint, Mino, B.I	No	B.I, DJ Tukutz
2014	Masta Wu	Non-album single	**"Come Here"** (featuring Dok2, Bobby)	Yes	Masta Wu, Dok2	No	Masta Wu, Teddy, Choice37
2014	Hi Suhyun	Non-album single	**"I'm Different"** (featuring Bobby) -	Yes	Masta Wu	No	P.K, Bekuh Boom
2016	Reddy	Show Me the Money 5	"Like this" (featuring Bobby)	Yes	Reddy	No	Seo Won Jin, Dress, Kush
2016	Lee Hi	Seoulite	"Video" (featuring Bobby)	Yes	Deanfluenza	No	DJ Tukutz, Deanfluenza, Le'mon
2017	Psy	4X2=8	"Bomb" (featuring B.I, Bobby)	Yes	B.I, J.Y. Park "The Asiansoul", Psy	Yes	B.I, J.Y. Park "The Asiansoul", Psy, Yoo Gun-hyung
2018	Mako, The Word Alive	League of Legends	"Rise (remix)" (featuring Bobby)	No	Alex Seaver, Riot Music Team, Justin Tranter	Yes	Riot Music Team, Alex Seaver, The Glitch Mob, Health
2019	TPA	Non-album single	"Super Asia" (featuring Bobby, VaVa)	Yes	Vava, Oyvind Saukik	Yes	TPA
2020	Mino	Take	"Ok Man" (featuring Bobby)	Yes	Mino	No	Mino
2021	Mudd the Student	Show Me the Money 10	"Moss" (featuring Mino, Bobby)	Yes	Mudd the Student, Mino	No	Mino, Mudd the Student, Gray
2021	Mino	To Infinity	"Language" (featuring Bobby)	Yes	Mino	No	Mino
2022	Huh	Show Me the Money 11	"Ugly Duckling" (featuring Sunwoo Jung-a, Bobby)	Yes	Huh, Sunwoo Jung-a	No	R.Tee, JuniorChef, Huh, Para9on, Sunwoo Jung-a
2023	Dohwa, Elly, Yeoreum, Yeeun, Yuki, Fyegoodgurl, Hwiseo	Queendom Puzzle Semi Final	"i DGA (I Don't Give A)"	Yes	-	Yes	The Proof
**Bold** denotes title track.

== Other works ==
Year	Artist(s)	Album	Song	Lyrics		Music	
Year	Artist(s)	Album	Song	Credited	With	Credited	With
2018	B.I, Bobby, Ahn Jung-hwan, Jasper Cho, Kwon Oh-joong, Kim Yong-man, Cha In-pyo	Non-album promotional single (Note: For MBC's show Curious Husband's Getaway.)	"Friend"	Yes	B.I, Ahn Jung-hwan, Jasper Cho, Cha In-pyo, Kwon Oh-joong, Kim Yong-man	No	B.I, Han Jong-seok, Kim Seung-jin
