= Mino discography =

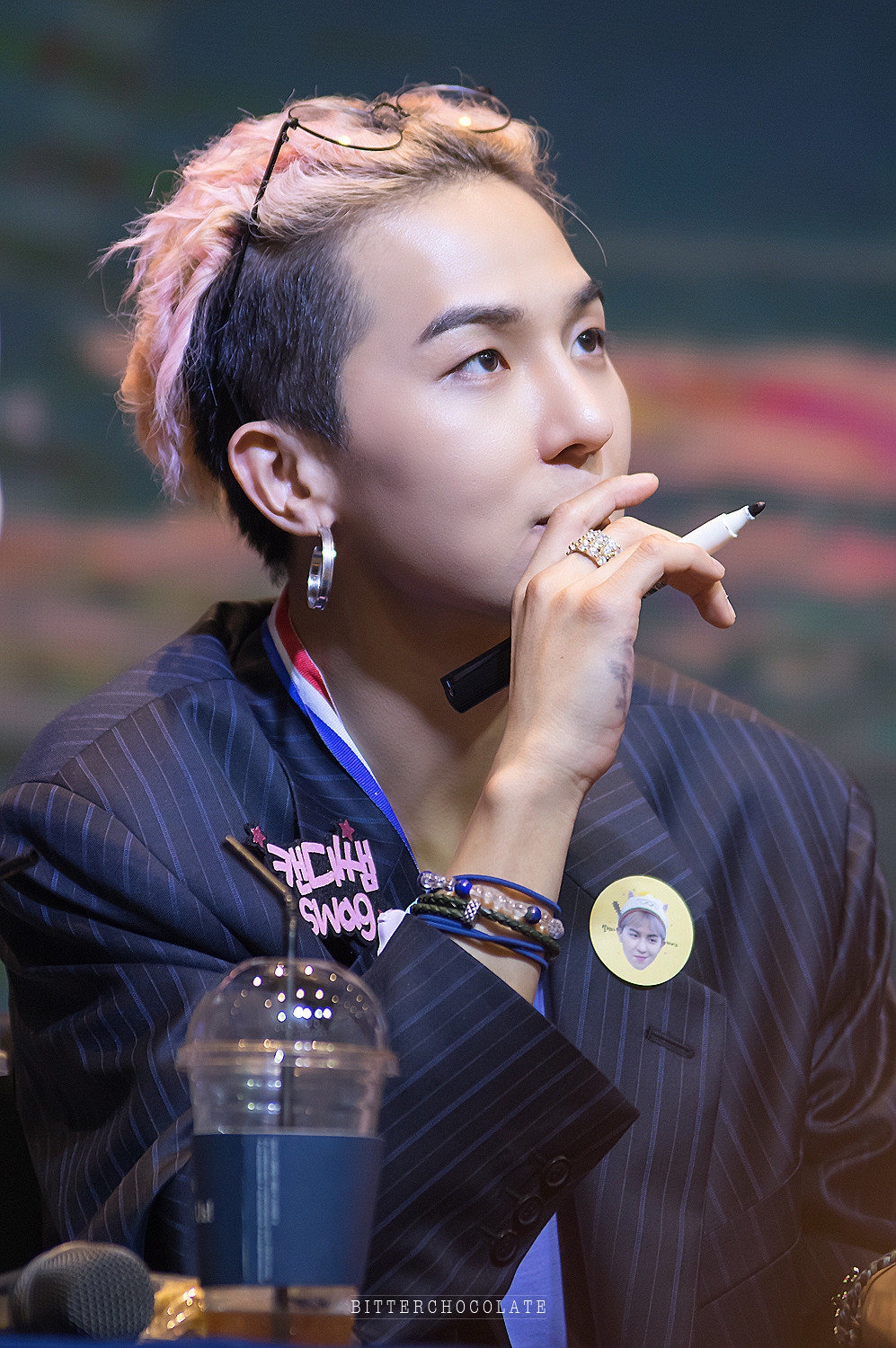
- Mino at Winner's fansign event in Yeouido on April 15, 2018
- Studio albums: 3
- Singles: 12
- Music videos: 5

South Korean rapper Mino released three studio albums, twelve singles as a lead-artist and thirteen as a featured-artist. Mino started his career as a member of the ballad group BoM in July 2011 under the name Tagoon. The group disbanded in 2013 and Mino auditioned for YG Entertainment, where he was promptly accepted. He debuted as a member of South Korean boyband Winner on August 12, 2014, with the studio album 2014 S/S. The album included Mino's first solo track, "I'm Him". While not released as a single, the song peaked at number 15 on South Korea's Gaon Digital Chart, selling 280,000 paid digital downloads.

In summer 2015, Mino participated in Show Me the Money 4, a South Korean rap competition TV show that aired on Mnet. The show spawned four singles—"Turtle Ship", "Money Flow", "Okey Dokey" and "Fear", with the latter featuring Big Bang's Taeyang. All four reached the top ten of the Gaon Digital Chart, with "Fear" peaking at number three. Furthermore, "Fear" became his first song to enter the Billboard World Digital Song Sales chart at number four. In September 2016, Mino and fellow rapper Bobby released their first collaborative extended play under the alias MOBB. The EP was supported by four singles, including the solo single "Body" which peaked at number 13 on the Gaon Digital Chart and sold 186,000 digital copies.

Mino's debut studio album XX was announced on September 13, 2018, and released on November 26 alongside the single "Fiancé". The single debuted and spent an additional week a top the Gaon Digital Chart, making it his first song to do so. As of February 2019, XX has sold more than 75,000 copies in South Korea. His second studio album Take was released on October 30, 2020. The album debuted at number four on the Gaon Album Chart, selling more than 100,000 copies in its release month.

== Studio albums ==
| Title | Details | Peak positions | | | | Sales |
| Title | Details | KOR | FRA Digital | JPN | US World | Sales |
|---|---|---|---|---|---|---|
| XX | Released: November 26, 2018; Label: YG Entertainment; Formats: CD, digital download | 5 | 115 | 118 | 13 | KOR: 73,107; JPN: 1,471 |
| Take | Released: October 30, 2020; Label: YG Entertainment; Formats: CD, digital download | 4 | * | — | — | KOR: 114,008 |
| To Infinity. | Released: December 7, 2021; Label: YG Entertainment; Formats: CD, digital download | 3 | * | — | — | KOR: 97,903 |
"—" denotes releases that did not chart or were not released in that region.

== Singles ==
=== As a lead artist ===
| Title | Year | Peak positions | | | | Sales | Certifications (Note: In April 2018, the Korea Music Content Association introduced music recording certifications for albums and singles.) | Album |
| Title | Year | KOR | | SGP | US World | Sales | Certifications | Album |
| Title | Year | Gaon | Hot (Note: The Billboard K-pop Hot 100 chart launched in 2011 and was discontinued in 2014. On the issue dated May 29 – June 4, 2017, the chart was re-established.) | SGP | US World | Sales | Certifications | Album |
|---|---|---|---|---|---|---|---|---|
| "Turtle Ship" (거북선) (with Ja Mezz, AndUp & Paloalto) | 2015 | 4 | * | * | — | KOR: 1,046,666 | —N/a | Show Me the Money 4 |
| "Money Flow" (다 비켜봐) (with Zico & Paloalto) | 2015 | 7 | * | * | — | KOR: 502,427 | —N/a | Show Me the Money 4 |
| "Fear" (겁) (featuring Taeyang) | 2015 | 3 | * | * | 9 | KOR: 1,536,567 | —N/a | Show Me the Money 4 |
| "Okey Dokey" (with Zico) | 2015 | 9 | * | * | — | KOR: 1,075,339 | —N/a | Show Me the Money 4 |
| "Pricked" (사랑가시) (with Nam Tae-hyun) | 2016 | 7 | * | * | 4 | KOR: 216,261 | —N/a | EXIT : E |
| "Body" (몸) | 2016 | 13 | * | * | 4 | KOR: 171,138 | —N/a | The MOBB |
| "Shoot" (쏘아) (with Haha) | 2016 | 3 | * | * | — | KOR: 405,045 | —N/a | Infinite Challenge Great Heritage |
| "Fiancé" (아낙네) | 2018 | 1 | 1 | 25 | 6 | KOR: 2,500,000 | KMCA: Platinum (Note: "Fiancé" was certified platinum for 2.5 million downloads in October 2021.) | XX |
| "Run Away" (도망가) | 2020 | 55 | 34 | — | — | —N/a | —N/a | Take |
| "Tang!♡" (탕!♡) | 2021 | 46 | 48 | — | — | —N/a | —N/a | To Infinity. |
"—" denotes releases that did not chart or were not released in that region. "*" denotes the chart did not exist at that time.

=== Promotional single ===
| Title | Year | Peak positions | Album |
| Title | Year | KOR | Album |
|---|---|---|---|
| "Pat Pat" (쓰담쓰담) (with P.O and Kyuhyun) | 2019 | 152 | Kang's Kitchen 3 |

=== Collaborations ===
| Title | Year | Peak positions | Sales | Album |
| Title | Year | KOR | Sales | Album |
|---|---|---|---|---|
| "Wild Boy" (Yoon Jong-shin with Kang Seung-yoon) | 2014 | 25 | KOR: 67,675 | Yoon Jong Shin Monthly - March 2014 |
| "Don't Call Me Mama" (with Moon Hee-kyung) | 2016 | 153 | KOR: 10,072 | Non-album single |
| "Better" (with Kang Seung-yoon) | 2021 | — (Note: "Better" did not enter the Gaon Digital Chart, but peaked at number 42 on the component Download chart.) | —N/a | Page |
"—" denotes releases that did not chart or were not released in that region.

=== As a featured artist ===
| Title | Year | Peak positions | | | Sales | Album |
| Title | Year | KOR | | US World | Sales | Album |
| Title | Year | Gaon | Hot | US World | Sales | Album |
|---|---|---|---|---|---|---|
| "Born Hater" (Epik High featuring Beenzino, Verbal Jint, B.I, Mino and Bobby) | 2014 | 3 | * | 5 | KOR: 1,278,861 | Shoebox |
| "World Tour" (비행) (Lee Hi featuring Mino) | 2016 | 14 | * | — | KOR: 236,646 | Seoulite |
| "Machine Gun" (Zion.T with Kush featuring Mino) | 2016 | 10 | * | — | KOR: 339,523 | Show Me the Money 5 |
| "Up" (Bobby featuring Mino) | 2017 | — (Note: "Up" did not enter the Gaon Digital Chart, but peaked at number 93 on the component Download chart.) | * | — | KOR: 15,059 | Love and Fall |
| "No Thanxxx" (Epik High featuring Mino, Simon Dominic and the Quiett) | 2017 | 4 | * | — | KOR: 387,491 | We've Done Something Wonderful |
| "Alchemy" (錬金術) (Ja Mezz featuring Dok2 & Mino) | 2018 | — | * | — | —N/a | GOØDevil |
| "Where R U From" (Seungri featuring Mino) | 2018 | 84 | 42 | — | —N/a | The Great Seungri |
| "Promise" (P.O featuring Mino) | 2019 | 148 | — | — | —N/a | Tony Lip |
| "Call Anytime" (또또또) (Kin Jin-woo featuring Mino) | 2019 | 127 | — | — | —N/a | Jinu's Heyday |
| "Nobody" (Blue.D featuring Mino) | 2019 | — | — | — | —N/a | Non-album single |
| "Breathe" (Anandelight, Unofficialboyy, Be’O, Geegooin, Mudd The Student featuring Mino) | 2021 | 1 | 7 | — | —N/a | Show Me the Money 10 Episode 1 |
| "Limousine" (리무진) (Be'O featuring Mino) | 2021 | 1 | 2 | — | —N/a | Show Me the Money 10 Episode 3 |
| "Moss" (이끼) (Mudd The Student featuring Mino and Bobby) | 2021 | 31 | 64 | — | —N/a | Show Me the Money 10 Episode 3 |
| "Nothing" (지나고 보면) (Be'O featuring Hwasa and Mino ) | 2021 | 73 | — | — | —N/a | Show Me the Money 10 Final |
"—" denotes releases that did not chart or were not released in that region. "*" denotes the chart did not exist at that time.

=== Other charted songs ===
| Title | Year | Peak positions | | Sales | Album |
| Title | Year | KOR | | Sales | Album |
| Title | Year | Gaon | Hot | Sales | Album |
|---|---|---|---|---|---|
| "I'm Him" (걔 세) | 2014 | 15 | * | KOR: 281,607 | 2014 S/S |
| "Turn of the Light" (손만 잡고 자자) | 2018 | 74 | 30 | —N/a | EVERYD4Y |
"*" denotes the chart did not exist at that time.

=== Soundtrack appearances ===
| Title | Year | Peak positions | Sales | Album |
| Title | Year | KOR | Sales | Album |
|---|---|---|---|---|
| "The Door" (문) (with Kang Seung-yoon) | 2017 | — (Note: "The Door" did not enter the Gaon Digital Chart, but peaked and debuted at number 79 on the Gaon Download Chart.) | KOR: 18,521 | Prison Playbook OST |

== Guest appearances ==
List of non-single guest appearances with other performing artists
| Title | Year | Other artist(s) | Album |
|---|---|---|---|
| "StrOngerrr" | 2017 | Code Kunst, Loco | Muggles' Mansion |
| "Hooligan" | 2019 | Eun Ji-won | G1 |
| "Perfect Thumbnail" | 2021 | Bewhy, Dynamic Duo | 032 Funk |

== Production credits ==
All song credits are adapted from the Korea Music Copyright Association's database unless stated otherwise.

=== Solo work ===
List of songs, showing year released, and name of the album
| Year | Song | Album | Lyricist | | Composer | |
| Year | Song | Album | Credited | With | Credited | With |
|---|---|---|---|---|---|---|
| 2014 | "Wild Boy" | Yoon Jong Shin Monthly - March 2014 | Yes | Yoon Jong-shin | No | – |
| 2014 | "I'm Him" (걔 세) | 2014 S/S | Yes | – | Yes | Teddy, Choice37 |
| 2015 | "Turtle Ship" (거북선) | Show Me the Money 4 | Yes | Ja Mezz, Paloalto, Andup | No | – |
| 2015 | "Money Flow" (다 비켜봐) | Show Me the Money 4 | Yes | Zico, Paloalto | No | – |
| 2015 | "Fear" (겁) | Show Me the Money 4 | Yes | Zico | No | – |
| 2015 | "Okey Dokey" | Show Me the Money 4 | Yes | Zico | No | – |
| 2015 | "Victim" (위하여) | Show Me the Money 4 | Yes | Paloalto, B-Free | No | – |
| 2016 | "Pricked" | EXIT: E | Yes | – | Yes | Kang Uk Jin |
| 2016 | "Don't Call Me Mama" | non-album single | Yes | Moon Heekyung | Yes | Choice37 |
| 2016 | "Body" | The MOBB | Yes | Future Bounce | Yes | Future Bounce |
| 2016 | "Shoot" (쏘아) | Infinite Challenge Great Heritage | Yes | – | Yes | Future Bounce, Bekuh Boom |
| 2017 | "The Door" (문) | Prison Playbook OST Part 2 | Yes | Zico | No | – |
| 2018 | "Turn Off The Light" | Everyday | Yes | – | Yes | Future Bounce |
| 2018 | "Trigger" (시발점) | XX | Yes | – | Yes | Kang Uk Jin |
| 2018 | "Fiancé" (아낙네) | XX | Yes | Ban Yawol | Yes | Lee Ho, Texu, Future Bounce |
| 2018 | "Hope" | XX | Yes | 1105 | Yes | 1105 |
| 2018 | "O2" (ㅇ2) | XX | Yes | Millennium | Yes | Millennium |
| 2018 | "Rocket" (로켓) | XX | Yes | – | Yes | Choice37 |
| 2018 | "Um..." (흠) | XX | Yes | – | Yes | Kang Uk Jin, Diggy |
| 2018 | "Lonely" (위로 해줄래) | XX | Yes | – | Yes | Airplay |
| 2018 | "Aurora" (오로라) | XX | Yes | Millennium | Yes | Millennium |
| 2018 | "Her" (어울려요) | XX | Yes | – | Yes | Diggy, Kang Uk Jin |
| 2018 | "Agree" (암) | XX | Yes | – | Yes | Future Bounce |
| 2018 | "Bow-Wow" (불구경) | XX | Yes | YDG | Yes | Kang Uk Jin |
| 2018 | "Alarm" (알람) | XX | Yes | – | Yes | Hae, Choice37 |
| 2019 | "Pat Pat" (쓰담쓰담) | Kang's Kitchen 3 | Yes | P.O | Yes | Airplay |
| 2020 | "Love and a Boy" | Take | Yes | – | Yes | – |
| 2020 | "Run away" (도망가) | Take | Yes | – | Yes | Diggy, Kang Uk Jin |
| 2020 | "OK Man" | Take | Yes | Bobby | Yes | – |
| 2020 | "Wa" | Take | Yes | Zion.T | Yes | P.K, Dee.P |
| 2020 | "I Want To" (하고싶어) | Take | Yes | Meenoi | Yes | Hae, Meenoi, Choice37 |
| 2020 | "Daylight" | Take | Yes | – | Yes | Ian Purp |
| 2020 | "Hop In" (어부바) | Take | Yes | DPR Live | Yes | Ian Purp |
| 2020 | "Pow!' (펑!) | Take | Yes | – | Yes | Airplay |
| 2020 | "Click / Han River View" | Take | Yes | – | Yes | Airplay |
| 2020 | "Bookstore" (교보문고) | Take | Yes | Bewhy | Yes | Airplay |
| 2020 | "Sunrise" | Take | Yes | – | Yes | – |
| 2020 | "Lost in a Crowd" (이유 없는 상실감에 대하여) | Take | Yes | – | Yes | Diggy, Kang Uk Jin |
| 2021 | "Love In Da Car" | To Infinity. | Yes | – | Yes | – |
| 2021 | "Tang!♡" (탕!♡) | To Infinity. | Yes | – | Yes | Airplay, Illjun |
| 2021 | "Pyramid" | To Infinity. | Yes | Lil Boi, Gaeko | Yes | – |
| 2021 | "Language" (바른말) | To Infinity. | Yes | Bobby | Yes | – |
| 2021 | "Kill" | To Infinity. | Yes | – | Yes | Kang Uk Jin, Diggy |
| 2021 | "Muah" (뭐) | To Infinity. | Yes | – | Yes | Airplay |
| 2021 | "Question Mark" (궁금해) | To Infinity. | Yes | – | Yes | Airplay |
| 2021 | "Drunk Talk' (ㅊ취했) | To Infinity. | Yes | Sogumm | Yes | Kang Uk Jin, Diggy, Sogumm |
| 2021 | "Losing U" | To Infinity. | Yes | – | Yes | Kang Uk Jin, Diggy |
| 2021 | "Sad Walk" (이별길에서) | To Infinity. | Yes | – | Yes | Airplay, Illjun |

=== Work as Winner ===
List of songs, showing year released, and name of the album
| Year | Song | Album | Lyricist | | Composer | |
| Year | Song | Album | Credited | With | Credited | With |
|---|---|---|---|---|---|---|
| 2013 | "Go Up" | WIN: Who Is Next (Final Battle) | Yes | Yoon, Hoony | No | – |
| 2013 | "Just Another Boy" | WIN: Who Is Next (Final Battle) | Yes | Teddy Park, Yoon, Hoony, Taehyun | Yes | Teddy Park, Yoon, Hoony |
| 2014 | "Empty" | 2014 S/S | Yes | B.I, Bobby | No | – |
| 2014 | "Color Ring" | 2014 S/S | Yes | Yoon, Hoony | No | – |
| 2014 | "Don't Flirt" | 2014 S/S | Yes | iHwak, Ham Seung-cheon, Kang Uk-jin, Hoony | No | – |
| 2014 | "But" | 2014 S/S | Yes | Taehyun, Hoony | No | – |
| 2014 | "Tonight" | 2014 S/S | Yes | Taehyun | No | – |
| 2014 | "Love is a Lie" | 2014 S/S | Yes | Yoon | No | – |
| 2014 | "Different" | 2014 S/S | Yes | Yoon, Hoony | Yes | Yoon |
| 2014 | "Smile Again" | 2014 S/S | Yes | Yoon, Hoony | Yes | Yoon, Dee.P |
| 2016 | "Baby Baby" | Exit: E | Yes | Taehyun, Hoony | No | – |
| 2016 | "Sentimental" | Exit: E | Yes | Taehyun, Hoony | No | – |
| 2016 | "Immature" | Exit: E | Yes | Yoon, Hoony | No | – |
| 2017 | "Really Really" | Fate Number For | Yes | Yoon, Hoony | Yes | Yoon, Kang Uk-jin |
| 2017 | "Love Me Love Me" | Our Twenty For | Yes | Yoon, Hoony | Yes | Yoon, Future Bounce |
| 2017 | "Island" | Our Twenty For | Yes | Yoon, Hoony, Bekuh Boom | No | – |
| 2018 | "Raining" | Our Twenty For (JP Ver.) | Yes | Hoony | No | – |
| 2018 | "Have a Good Day" | Our Twenty For (JP Ver.) | Yes | Hoony | Yes | Yoon |
| 2018 | "Everyday" | Everyday | Yes | Yoon, Hoony | Yes | Yoon, AiRPLAY |
| 2018 | "Hello" (여보세요) | Everyday | Yes | Hoony, Millennium | Yes | Millennium |
| 2018 | "For" (애 걔) | Everyday | Yes | Yoon, Hoony | Yes | Yoon, Kang Uk-jin, Diggy |
| 2018 | "Have A Good Day" (KR Ver.) | Everyday | Yes | Hoony | Yes | Kang Uk-jin, Yoon |
| 2018 | "Air" | Everyday | Yes | Yoon, Hoony | No | – |
| 2018 | "La La" | Everyday | Yes | Yoon, Hoony | No | – |
| 2018 | "Luxury" (사치) | Everyday | Yes | Yoon, Hoony | No | – |
| 2018 | "Movie Star" | Everyday | Yes | Yoon, Hoony | No | – |
| 2018 | "Special Night" | Everyday | Yes | Hoony | No | – |
| 2018 | "Raining" (KR Ver.) | Everyday | Yes | Hoony | No | – |
| 2019 | "Ah Yeah" (아예) | We | Yes | Yoon, Hoony | No | – |
| 2019 | "Zoo" (동물의왕국) | We | Yes | Hoony | Yes | Kang Uk-jin, Diggy |
| 2019 | "Mola" (몰라도너무몰라) | We | Yes | Hoony | No | – |
| 2019 | "Boom" | We | Yes | Yoon, Hoony | No | – |
| 2019 | "Everyday" (remix) | We | Yes | Yoon, Hoony | Yes | Yoon, AiRPLAY |
| 2019 | "First Love (2019)" 첫사랑) | We | Yes | Jeon Hae-seong, Hoony | No | – |
| 2020 | "Remember" | Remember | Yes | – | Yes | Kang Uk-jin, Diggy |
| 2020 | "Hold" (뜸) | Remember | Yes | – | Yes | R. Tee |
| 2020 | "Just Dance" (막춤) | Remember | Yes | Yoon, Hoony | No | – |
| 2020 | "My Bad" | Remember | Yes | Hoony | Yes | Future Bounce |
| 2020 | "Teaser" | Remember | Yes | Yoon, Hoony | No | – |
| 2020 | "Well" | Remember | Yes | Yoon, Hoony | No | – |
| 2020 | "Empty" (공허해 (4 ver.) | Remember | Yes | B.I, Bobby | No | – |
| 2020 | "Don't Flirt" (끼부리지마) (4 ver.) | Remember | Yes | iHwak, Ham Seung-chun, Kang Uk-jin, Hoony | No | – |
| 2020 | "Color Ring" (컬러링) (4 ver.) | Remember | Yes | Yoon, Hoony | No | – |
| 2020 | "Different" (4 ver.) | Remember | Yes | Yoon, Hoony | Yes | Yoon |
| 2022 | "I Love U" | Holiday | Yes | Yoon, Lee Chan-hyuk, Airplay, Kid Wine, Bang Ye-dam | No | – |
| 2022 | "10 Min" (10분) | Holiday | Yes | Yoon, Hoony | No | – |
| 2022 | "Holiday" | Holiday | Yes | Yoon, Hoony | No | – |
| 2022 | "Sweet Home" (집으로) | Holiday | Yes | Yoon, Hoony | No | – |
| 2022 | "Family" | Holiday | Yes | Yoon, Seunghoon, Ahn Young Joo, Y0ung | No | – |
| 2022 | "Little Finger" (새끼손가락) | Holiday | Yes | Yoon, Hoony | Yes | Yoon, AiRPLAY |

=== Other artists ===
List of songs, showing year released, artist name, and name of the album
| Year | Artist | Song | Album | Lyricist | | Composer | |
| Year | Artist | Song | Album | Credited | With | Credited | With |
|---|---|---|---|---|---|---|---|
| 2011 | ZoPD | "Where I'm From" | Pt.1 State Of The Art | Yes | Dok2 | No | – |
| 2014 | Epik High | "Born Hater" | Shoebox | Yes | Bobby, B.I, Tablo, Mithra Jin, Kim Jintae, Beenzino | No | – |
| 2016 | Lee Hi | "World Tour" | Seoulite | Yes | Deanfluenza, Re:One, Bristol Johnny | Yes | Deanfluenza, Re:One, Bristol Johnny |
| 2016 | Zion.T & Kush | "Machine Gun" | non-album single | Yes | Zion.T, Kush | No | – |
| 2016 | MOBB | "Hit Me" (빨리 전화해) | The MOBB | Yes | Bobby, Kush | Yes | Seo Wonjin, Bobby, Teddy, Kush, Choice37 |
| 2016 | MOBB | "Full House" (붐벼) | The MOBB | Yes | Bobby | Yes | Teddy, Choice37 |
| 2017 | Code Kunst | "StrOngerrr" | Muggles' Mansion | Yes | Loco | Yes | Code Kunst |
| 2017 | Bobby | "Up" | Love and Fall | Yes | Bobby | Yes | Bobby, Choice37 |
| 2017 | Sechs Kies | "Back Hug" | Another Light | Yes | Hoony, Eun Jiwon, Bigtone, Min Yeonjae | No | – |
| 2017 | Epik High | "No Thanxxx" | We've Done Something Wonderful | Yes | Tablo, Mithra Jin, The Quiett, Simon D | No | – |
| 2018 | iKon | "Rubber Band" | The New Kids | Yes | Bobby, B.I, Seung | Yes | B.I, Millennium |
| 2018 | Ja Mezz | "Alchemy" (錬金術) | GOØDevil | Yes | Ja Mezz, Willyeom, Dok2 | No | – |
| 2018 | Seungri | "Where R U From" | The Great Seungri | Yes | Seungri | No | – |
| 2018 | Treasure | "Going Crazy" | non-album single | Yes | Future Bounce, Bigtone | No | – |
| 2019 | Eun Ji-won | "I'm On Fire" | G1 | Yes | – | Yes | Future Bounce |
| 2019 | Eun Ji-won | "Hooligan" | G1 | Yes | Eun Jiwon | Yes | Diggy, Kang Ukjin |
| 2019 | P.O | "Promise" | Tony Lip | Yes | P.O | No | – |
| 2019 | Kim Jinwoo | "Call Anytime" | Jinu's Heyday | Yes | Zayvo, Choice37 | Yes | Hae, Zayvo, Choice37 |
| 2019 | Blue.D | "Nobody" | non-album single | Yes | Se-a, Zayvo, Lil G, Choice37, Bekuh Boom | Yes | Hae, Zayvo, Choice37, Bekuh Boom |
| 2019 | CL | "Rewind" (처음으로) | In the Name of Love | Yes | CL, Kouame Jean Baptiste, Michael Henry, Kyle Edwards, August Grant | Yes | CL, Kouame Jean Baptiste, Michael Henry, Kyle Edwards, August Grant |
| 2021 | Kang Seungyoon | "Better" | Page | Yes | Kang Seungyoon | No | – |
| 2021 | iKon | "At Ease" (열 중쉬어) | Kingdom Final: Who Is The King? | Yes | Bobby | Yes | Future Bounce |
| 2021 | Bewhy | "Perfect Thumbnail" | 032 Funk | Yes | Bewhy, Choiza, Gaeko | No | – |
| 2021 | Anandelight, Mudd The Student, Be'O, Unofficialboyy, Geegoin | "Breathe" (쉬어) | Show Me the Money 10 Episode 1 | Yes | Anandelight, Mudd The Student, Be'O, Unofficialboyy, Geegoin | Yes | Gray, Dax, Trevor |
| 2021 | Mudd The Student | "Moss" (이끼) | Show Me the Money 10 Episode 3 | Yes | Bobby, Mudd The Student | Yes | Mudd The Student |
| 2021 | Be'O | "Limousine" (리무진) | Show Me the Money 10 Episode 3 | Yes | Gray, Be'O | No | – |
| 2021 | Be'O | "Nothing" (지나고 보면) | Show Me the Money 10 Final | Yes | Gray, Be'O | No | – |
| 2024 | BabyMonster | "Really Like You" | Drip | Yes | | No | – |

== Videography ==
=== Music videos ===
| Year | Title | Director(s) | Length | Ref. |
|---|---|---|---|---|
| 2014 | "I'm Him" (걔 세) | Ziyong (Fantazy Lab) | 3:21 | |
| 2016 | "Body" (몸) | Dream Perfect Regime | 3:19 | |
| 2018 | "Fiancé" (아낙네) | Seo Hyun Seung | 3:45 | |
| 2020 | "Runaway" (도망가) | 725 (Sl8ight Visual Lab) | 2:50 | |
| 2021 | "Tang!♡" (탕!♡) | 725 (Sl8ight Visual Lab) | 3:15 | |

== See also ==
- Winner discography
