= Iron (rapper) =

South Korean rapper (1992–2021)

- Born: Jung Hun-cheol; January 8, 1992; South Korea
- Died: January 25, 2021 (aged 29) Jung District, Seoul, South Korea
- Genres: Hip hop
- Occupation: Rapper
- Instrument: Vocals
- Years active: 2014–2017
- Labels: Polaris; Blockberry Creative

Korean name
- Hangul: 정헌철
- RR: Jeong Heoncheol
- MR: Chŏng Hŏnch'ŏl

Jung Hun-cheol (January 8, 1992 – January 25, 2021), better known by his stage name Iron (Korean: 아이언), was a South Korean rapper. He was a contestant on Show Me the Money 3. He released his only album, Rock Bottom, on September 9, 2016.

== Legal issues ==
In November 2018, he was convicted of multiple counts of assault against his ex-girlfriend. It was stated that he had hit her in the face during sex, causing fractures; he also strangled her when she attempted to end the relationship, as well as injuring himself with a kitchen knife and threatening to blame it on her. He then revealed her identity in media interviews during the court process and publicly defamed her, calling her a masochist and denying any wrongdoing.

In December 2020, he was again placed under arrest for assault with a baseball bat against his roommate, who was a minor at the time.

== Death ==
On January 25, 2021, at approximately 10:25 AM KST, a security guard discovered bleeding Jung lying in a flowerbed outside an apartment complex in Seoul's central district. Jung was taken to a local hospital, but was pronounced dead on arrival. An investigation revealed the apartment complex was not Jung's residence. Foul play and homicide were ruled out, and at the request of Jung's family, a post-mortem was not carried out.

== Discography ==
=== Studio albums ===
Title	Album details	Peak chart positions	Sales
Title	Album details	KOR	Sales
Rock Bottom	Released: September 9, 2016; Label: Cow, Blockberry Creative, NHN Entertainment; Formats: CD, digital download	24	KOR: 752

=== Singles ===
Title	Year	Peak chart positions	Sales (DL)	Album
Title	Year	KOR	Sales (DL)	Album
As lead artist
"I Am"	2014	31	KOR: 218,369	Show Me the Money 3
"Malice" (독기)	2014	2	KOR: 671,664	Show Me the Money 3
"Puss" with Shin Ji-min	2015	1	KOR: 992,890	Unpretty Rapstar
"Blu" feat. Babylon	2015	35	KOR: 133,709	Non-album single
"System"	2016	85	KOR: 28,216	Rock Bottom
"Rock Bottom"	2016	—	—N/a	Rock Bottom
As featured artist
"Erase" (지워) Hyolyn and Jooyoung feat. Iron	2014	9	KOR: 495,758	Non-album single
"Crazy (Guilty Pleasure)" Jonghyun feat. Iron	2015	5	KOR: 105,957	Base
"Don't Be Shy" (아끼지마) Primary feat. Choa and Iron	2015	10	KOR: 402,060	2
