= Kang Chun-hyok =

North Korean defector and rapper

- Born: 1986 (age 39–40); Onsong County, North Hamgyong Province, North Korea
- Known for: Defection from North Korea

Korean name
- Hangul: 강춘혁
- RR: Gang Chunhyeok
- MR: Kang Ch'unhyŏk

Kang Chun-hyok (Korean: 강춘혁) is a North Korean defector, artist, and rapper. Kang defected during the late 1990s and early 2000s.

== Early life and defection ==
Kang was born in Onseong, North Hamgyong Province, North Korea.

Kang's father left North Korea for China in 1997 but was caught and imprisoned. Kang was a kotjebi (homeless child). When he was 9 or 10 years old he witnessed a public execution. He ran away from home at age 13. (Note: It is noted that Kang was 12 years old when the family defected in 1998, however this discrepancy may be due to the fact that age is counted differently in Korea)

Once Kang's father was released from prison, the family crossed the Tumen river to China in 1998. In 2001, the family were caught by the Chinese police. Kang bribed the Chinese officials, and travelled to South Korea via Vietnam and Cambodia. His family reunited with him in South Korea later that year.

== Life in South Korea ==
He studied fine arts at Hongik University in Seoul.

In 2014, Kang appeared on series three of Show Me the Money. Following his appearance on the show, he began producing an album with Yang Dong-geun. Kang's raps are about his experiences in North Korea. His art was showcased in the exhibition Kkotjebi in Bloom: North Korean Children's Flight to Freedom (꽃제비 날다 전시회) focusing on the experiences of being a homeless child. His work was shown alongside pieces by Sun Mu.

In 2016, he appeared on the TV show Abnormal Summit talking about his experiences defecting.

== Discography ==
Kang has released the songs "못 다한 이야기 (Feat 3mm)" and "For the Freedom (feat. 3mm, CarpeDiem)" on YouTube in 2015 and 2016, respectively. In 2021, he released a song called "Vendetta (Feat. 3mm)".

== Filmography ==
=== Television series ===
Year	Title	Network	Role	Notes
2014	Show Me the Money	Mnet	Himself	Participant
2016	Non-Summit	JTBC	Himself	Guest
