= Lucky Man (Bobby album) =

- Digital and "A" version cover

Studio album by Bobby
- Released: January 25, 2021
- Genre: K-pop; hip hop; R&B
- Length: 47:44
- Language: Korean
- Label: YG Entertainment

Bobby chronology
Love and Fall (2017)	Lucky Man (2021)	S.i.R (2023)

Singles from Lucky Man
- 1. "U Mad" Released: January 25, 2021

Lucky Man is the second studio album by South Korean rapper Bobby. It was released on January 25, 2021, by YG Entertainment. The album consists of 17 tracks, including 13 songs and 4 skits, all written and co-composed by Bobby. "U Mad" serves as the lead single; fellow iKon members DK and June featured on "Ur Soul Ur Body" and "Raining" respectively. Lucky Man expresses the diverse emotions Bobby experienced in his 20s.

Talking about Lucky Man in an interview, Bobby stated, "The main theme is the portrayal of all the bliss and sorrows people go through in youth -- falling in love with someone, enduring the agony of a breakup, overcoming the deep sorrow and making a recovery." The album's title conveys Bobby's appreciation and how he feels “lucky to be able to feel so many different emotions” in his 20s.

Apart from writing and co-composing all 17 tracks, Bobby also took part in the making of the music video for the title track, "U Mad," to ensure that it embodies the message he wants to convey.

== Background and release ==
On January 14, 2021, YG Entertainment dropped a "coming soon" teaser video of Bobby, hinting an upcoming music project from him. Then on January 16, with the release of a second teaser video, it was revealed that Bobby will soon be releasing his second studio album. Following this teaser, YG Entertainment announced the title of the album to be Lucky Man, and to be released on January 25, 2021. The full track list, including the featurings by fellow iKon members DK and June were revealed on January 20, 2021.

The album was released to digital music and streaming platforms on January 25, 2021, along with a music video for "U Mad". The album's CDs were made available for pre-order prior to the album release, and were released on January 28, 2021. Two different versions of the CDs were made available, "A" and "B".

== Track listing ==
All lyrics are written by Bobby

Lucky Man track listing
No.	Title	Music	Arrangement	Length
1.	"U Mad" (야 우냐)	Bobby; The Proof	The Proof	2:50
2.	"Skit 1"			0:30
3.	"Rockstar"	Bobby; HRDR	HRDR	3:05
4.	"No Time"	Bobby; HRDR	HRDR	3:05
5.	"Break It Down"	Bobby; Royal Dive	Royal Dive	3:10
6.	"Skit 2"			0:30
7.	"In The Dark" (새벽에)	Bobby; The Proof	The Proof	3:44
8.	"Lilac" (라일락)	Bobby; The Proof	The Proof	2:48
9.	"Ur Soul Ur Body" (featuring DK)	Bobby; Kang Uk-jin; Diggy	Kang Uk-jin; Diggy	3:25
10.	"Skit 3" (featuring Omar)			1:55
11.	"Gorgeous" (우아해)	Bobby; Royal Dive	Royal Dive	3:21
12.	"Liar"	Bobby; The Proof	The Proof	3:57
13.	"Heartbroken Playboy" (주옥)	Bobby; Millennium; Diggy	Millennium; Diggy	3:36
14.	"Skit 4"			0:40
15.	"Raining" (featuring June)	Bobby; HRDR	HRDR	3:36
16.	"Let It Go" (내려놔)	Bobby; The Proof	The Proof	3:54
17.	"Devil"	Bobby; The Proof	The Proof	3:30

== Charts ==
Weekly chart performance for Lucky Man
Chart (2021)	Peak position
South Korean Albums (Gaon)	4

== Release history ==
Release dates and formats for Lucky Man
Region	Date	Format(s)	Label	Ref.
Various	January 25, 2021	Digital download; streaming	YG Entertainment	
South Korea	January 28, 2021	CD (2 versions: "A" and "B")	YG Entertainment	
