= Love and Fall =

- Digital cover

Studio album by Bobby
- Released: September 14, 2017
- Recorded: 2017
- Genre: K-pop; hip hop; R&B
- Language: Korean
- Label: YG Entertainment

Bobby chronology
The Mobb (2016)	Love and Fall (2017)	Lucky Man (2021)

Singles from Love and Fall
- 1. "I Love You" Released: September 14, 2017; 2. "Runaway" Released: September 14, 2017

Love and Fall is the debut studio album by South Korean rapper Bobby. The album consists of ten tracks, all written and composed by Bobby. Love and Fall was released on September 14, 2017, by YG Entertainment. The album features two lead singles, "I Love You" and "Runaway".

== Track listing ==
No.	Title	Lyrics	Music	Arrangement	Length
1.	"사랑해" (I Love You)	Bobby	Bobby; Kang Uk-jin; Diggy	Kang Uk Jin; Diggy	3:30
2.	"Runaway"	Bobby	Bobby; Choice37	Choice37	3:43
3.	"다른 세상 사람" (Different Earth People (Alien))	Bobby	Bobby; Millenium	Millenium	3:14
4.	"텐데" (Tendae / I Would)	Bobby	Bobby; Millenium	Millenium	3:36
5.	"Up" (feat. Mino)	Bobby; Mino	Bobby; Mino; Choice37	Choice37	4:10
6.	"Secret" (feat. DK, Katie)	Bobby; DK	Bobby; Millenium	Millenium	3:36
7.	"In Love"	Bobby	Bobby; Choice37	Choice37	3:36
8.	"수영해" (Swim)	Bobby	Bobby; Millenium	Millenium	4:01
9.	"Firework"	Bobby	Bobby; Kang Uk-jin	Kang Uk-jin	3:46
10.	"내게 기대" (Lean On Me)	Bobby	Bobby; Choice37	Choice37	3:43

== Charts ==
Chart (2017)	Peak position
Japanese Albums (Oricon)	39
South Korean Albums (Gaon)	4
Taiwan Albums Chart (G-Music)	7
US World Albums (Billboard)	2

== Sales ==
Country	Sales
South Korea	39,068
Japan	1,535

== Release history ==
Release dates and formats for Love and Fall
Region	Date	Format(s)	Label	Ref.
Various	September 14, 2017	Digital download; streaming	YG Entertainment	
South Korea	September 15, 2017	CD (2 versions: Love and Fall)	YG Entertainment	
