= Show Me the Money 3 =

- Season 3
- Hosted by: Kim Jin-pyo (김진표)
- Judges: Team YG: Tablo; Masta Wu; Team YDG: Yang Dong-geun; Team Brand New Music: Swings; San E Team Illionaire: Dok2; The Quiett
- Winner: Bobby
- Runner-up: IRON

Release
- Original network: Mnet
- Original release: July 3 – September 4, 2014

Season chronology
- Next → Show Me the Money 4

The third season of Show Me the Money (SMTM3), which aired in 2014, saw a huge change in production as prominent figures of the Korean hip-hop scene participated in the show. Over 3,000 people auditioned this season, 1.5 times the amount last season, including underground rappers, non-Koreans, students, and previous SMTM contestants. The winner receives one hundred million won prize money, a record deal, and an opportunity to hold a special performance.

Notable contestants that did not make it to the Top 16 include ODEE of Vismajor, Beall, Changmo, Sapo, New Champ, Kang Chun-hyok (a North Korean rapper and artist), Tymee (E.via), Jolly V., Kisum, ult from Kinetic Flow, Born Kim, Kim Hyo-eun and Tarae.

The show, however, had been criticized for its editing by its producers and contestants. Despite this, songs from the show have successfully dominated music charts more than once.

== Producer Teams (Judges) ==
Team Brand New Music ("Team Swings & San E"):

- Swings: Previous contestant of SMTM2
- San E

Team Illionaire ("Team Dok2 & The Quiett"):

- Dok2
- The Quiett

Team YDG:

- Yang Dong-geun

Team YG ("Team Tablo & Masta Wu")

- Tablo
- Masta Wu

== Teams (Top 16) ==
Team YG

- Olltii
- B.I
- Yuk Ji-dam
- Snacky Chan

Team YDG

- Iron
- Giriboy
- Han Sangyup
- Jung Sangsoo

Team Illionaire

- Bobby
- Chamane
- Toy
- Pyungan

Team Brand New

- Vasco (now known as BILL STAX)
- C Jamm
- Boo Hyunsuk
- Sung Janggun

== Rounds ==
=== Round One - First Round Auditions ===
Groups of one hundred contestants come up at a time, and one by one contestants must rap a cappella in front of a producer. In order to pass on to the next round, contestants must meet the producer's judging criteria and be given the SMTM necklace. In particular, YDG caused much commotion by using his ambiguous judging criteria to pass rappers that other judges would not have passed.

=== Round Two - Solo Judgement (Second Round Auditions) ===
Contestants prepare a one-minute rap using a beat of their choice and perform alone in front of all the producer teams. In order to pass this round, contestants must receive at least one pass from one of the producer teams. If all four producer teams press the elimination button before the 60 seconds is up, the contestant fails. Again, YDG passed rappers that other producers did not deem appropriate, causing them to give him the nickname "hip-hop rescue team". 96 of the 3000 plus contestants from Round One made it to this round.

=== Round Three - 1:1 Battle (Third Round Auditions) ===
Contestants pair up for a 1v1 rap battle. The host chooses a contestant at random, who is then able to pick their opponent. The two contestants will then select one of the 12 given beats to perform together within a time limit. The producers eliminate one of the two contestants based on the performance. In the event of a tie, the two contestants must rap freestyle to a beat. 46 of the 96 rappers from Round Two made it to this round.

Match Highlights
Sung Janggun	vs.	Nam Youngwook
Bobby	vs.	Jamezz (Kim Sunghee)
Jung Minjae	vs.	Jolly V.
C Jamm	vs.	Giriboy
Hyun Jaegwang	vs.	Jung Sangsoo
B.I	vs.	Jin Joonhyun
Snacky Chan	vs.	Choi Jaesung
Vasco	vs.	Shim Hyunbo (Now known as Dbo)
Kim Chulbeom	vs.	Chamane
J.slow	vs.	Iron
Tarae	vs.	Kim Hyoeun

==== Revival Round ====
The producers picked four eliminated rappers. Picking either X or O out of a hat, the four were randomly assigned a battle.

Revival Round Match-Ups
B.I	vs.	J.slow
Owen Ovadoz	vs.	Giriboy

=== Round Four - Team Selections (Top 16) ===
A SMTM3 special concert was held in which the producer teams each gave a performance. Afterwards, contestants must select a producer team that they want to be in. If a producer team does not get at least four members, the producer team and the members that chose them will be eliminated.

SMTM3 special concert lineup
Producer Team	Artist(s)	Song
Team Illionaire	Dok2 & The Quiett	"2 Chainz & Rollies"
Team Illionaire	Dok2 & The Quiett	"Connecting Link"
Team Brand New	Swings	"Bulldozer"
Team Brand New	Swings & San E	"All Come In"
Team YG	Tablo	"Origin"
Team YG	Masta Wu	"Come Here"
Team YG	Tablo & Masta Wu	"Light It Up"
Team YDG	YDG	"Shake"
Team YDG	YDG	"Raise the Dog"

One by one, contestants must choose their desired producer team by entering the respective room. After initially choosing a room, contestants were then given a chance to switch rooms, and this saved Team Illionaire—which only had three members at first—from elimination. 25 rappers made it to this round. 8 chose Team YG; 6 chose Team Brand New; 6 chose Team Illionaire; and 5 chose Team YDG. Out of all the rappers that chose them, producer teams must choose four to form their team. This Round formed SMTM3's Top 16 rappers.

=== Round Five - Individual Performances ===
Prior to the performance, the producers decide, using their own method, on one person to eliminate. This formed the season's Top 12 rappers.

A rapper is chosen at random to perform, and the audience votes and decides the 1st to 12th place rappers. 195 people in total voted. A team score is generated based on adding up the members' scores and the teams are then ranked: Team Illionaire came in last; Team YDG third; Team YG second, despite two of their rappers forgetting their lyrics; and Team Brand New first. The top team gets the advantage of deciding the Round Six battles.

Performance Highlights
Team	Rapper	Song
Team Brand New	Vasco	"BooooM"
Team YG	Yook Jidam	"High Teen"
Team Brand New	C Jamm	"A Yo"
Team YDG	Giriboy	"Rain Showers Remix"
Team Illionaire	Bobby	"I'm Ill"
Team YG	Olltii	"No Dollmodel"
Team YG	B.I	"Dumb head"
Team YDG	Iron	"Look Out for Detox"

Individual Performance Results
Team	Rapper	Rank	Votes
Team Brand New	Vasco	1	79
Team YDG	Iron	3	15
Team Illionaire	Bobby	6	14
Team YG	B.I	2	22
Team YG	Olltii	3	15
Team Brand New	C Jamm	3	15
Team YG	Yook Jidam	9	7
Team YDG	Han Sangyup	7	10
Team Illionaire	Chamane	9	7
Team Illionaire	Toy	12	1
Team Brand New	Boo Hyunsuk	8	8
Team YDG	Giriboy	11	2

=== Round Six - First Round Performances ===
Round Five's winning team decided the team battles, which were: Team Brand New vs. Team Illionaire, and Team YDG vs. Team YG. Members of each team were ranked 1st, 2nd, and 3rd from Round Five. The top rapper automatically gets to perform and go to the next Round, but the producers must choose one person out of 2nd and 3rd place rappers to perform, thereby eliminating the other. The 2nd and 3rd place are to prepare two versions of the same song, and on the day of the rehearsal the producers conducts the selection, based on the rappers' performance. This formed the Top 6 rappers. Vasco, IRON, Bobby, and B.I were first in their teams last Round and guaranteed a spot in the first round performances.

During their performance, each rapper gets performance money based on votes from the audience. Team members' performance money are then added up to get the team's overall performance money. The losing team of the team battles gets their lowest-earning performer eliminated.

Match-Ups
Round 1	Team YG	vs.	Team YDG
Round 1	Olltii - "OLL' Ready"	vs.	Giriboy - "Truck 1991"
Round 2	Team Illionaire	vs.	Team Brand New
Round 2	Chamane - "19"	vs.	C Jamm - "Jungle" (Feat. Genius Nochang, Just Band)
Round 3	Team YG	vs.	Team YDG
Round 3	B.I - "Be I"	vs.	Iron - "Blue Gangsta + I AM"
Round 4	Team Illionaire	vs.	Team Brand New
Round 4	Bobby - "Go!"	vs.	Vasco - "Fresh & Blood + Guerilla's Way"

Results
Team	Rapper	Individual Money	Team Money
Team Brand New	Vasco	3,375,000	6,525,000
Team Brand New	C Jamm	3,150,000	6,525,000
Team YG	Olltii	2,800,000	4,500,000
Team YG	B.I	1,700,000	4,500,000
Team Illionaire	Bobby	1,525,000	2,900,000
Team Illionaire	Chamane	1,375,000	2,900,000
Team YDG	IRON	3,175,000	4,825,000
Team YDG	Giriboy	1,650,000	4,825,000

=== Round Seven - First Round of Finals ===
The theme is "Love". Rappers collaborate with a special guest rapper.

Again, each rapper gets performance money during their performance based on votes from the audience. Team members' performance money are then added up to get the team's overall performance money. The losing team of the team battles gets their lowest-earning performer eliminated. Team YG was eliminated.

Match-Ups
Round 1	Team Brand New	vs.	Team YDG
Round 1	Vasco - "187 + Grey" (Feat. 조현아)	vs.	Iron - "Let's Do It Again" (Feat. Skull)
Round 2	Team YG	vs.	Team Illionaire
Round 2	Olltii - "That XX" (Feat. ZICO of Block B)	vs.	Bobby - "L4L (Lookin' 4 Luv)" (Feat. Dok2 & The Quiett)
Round 3	Team Brand New	vs.	Team YDG
Round 3	C Jamm - "More + Good Day" (Feat. Swings)	vs.	Giriboy - "Beauty + My Body Is On Fire" (Feat. ???)

Results
Team	Rapper	Individual Money	Team Money
Team Brand New	Vasco	6,800,000	14,500,000
Team Brand New	C Jamm	7,700,000	14,500,000
Team YDG	Iron	3,100,000	5,300,000
Team YDG	Giriboy	2,200,000	5,300,000
Team YG	Olltii	3,650,000	-
Team Illionaire	Bobby	6,150,000	-

=== Round Eight - Semi-finals ===
The match list for the semi-finals was decided by the top winner last round, C Jamm. The theme is "Money". Team Brand New remained undefeated until this round, but Bobby won Vasco by a difference of 10 votes. Team Brand New was eliminated.

Match-Ups
Round 1	Team Illionaire	vs.	Team Brand New
Round 1	Bobby - "YGGR#Hip-hop"	vs.	Vasco - "Ripple Effect + More" (Feat. 천재노창)
Round 2	Team Brand New	vs.	Team YDG
Round 2	C Jamm - "Shit" (Feat. BewhY)	vs.	Iron - "Malice" (Feat. 강허달림)

Results
Team	Rapper	Individual Money
Team Illionaire	Bobby	5,250,000
Team Brand New	Vasco	4,750,000
Team Brand New	C Jamm	2,200,000
Team YDG	Iron	7,750,000

=== Round Nine - Final Round ===
Bobby won the first round of voting, as well as the final results. After losing continuously throughout the whole season, Team Illionaire won Show Me the Money 3.

Match-Up
Team Illionaire	vs.	Team YDG
Bobby - "Raise the Guard and Bounce"	vs.	Iron - "C Da Future"

Results
Team	Rapper	First Round Results	Final results
Team Illionaire	Bobby	3,010,000	7,735,000
Team YDG	Iron	2,240,000	4,235,000

== Top Contestants ==
Top 12:

- Team Brand New: C Jamm, Vasco, Boo Hyunsuk
- Team YDG: Iron, Giriboy, Han Sangyup
- Team YG: Olltii, B.I, Yook Jidam
- Team Illionaire: Bobby, Chamane, Toy

Top 8:

- Team Brand New: C Jamm, Vasco
- Team YDG: Iron, Giriboy
- Team YG: Olltii, B.I
- Team Illionaire: Bobby, Chamane

Top 6:

- Team Brand New: C Jamm, Vasco
- Team YDG: Iron, Giriboy
- Team YG: Olltii
- Team Illionaire: Bobby

Semi-finalists (Top 4):

- Team Brand New: C Jamm, Vasco
- Team YDG: Iron
- Team Illionaire: Bobby

Finalists:

- Team YDG: Iron
- Team Illionaire: Bobby

Winner:

- Team Illionaire: Bobby
