= S.i.R (single album) =

Single album by Bobby
- Released: March 21, 2023
- Genre: K-pop; synth-pop; pop
- Length: 6:06
- Language: Korean
- Label: 143 Entertainment
- Producer: Bobby

Bobby chronology
Lucky Man (2021)	S.i.R (2023)	Robert (2023)

Singles from S.i.R
- 1. "Cherry Blossom" Released: March 20, 2023; 2. "Drowning" Released: March 21, 2023

S.i.R is the first single album by South Korean rapper Bobby. It was released on March 21, 2023, through 143 Entertainment. The single album features two songs, "Drowning" and "Cherry Blossom," both written and co-composed by Bobby. "Drowning" features Korean R&B singer-songwriter Sole. S.i.R is also the first of four records that Bobby plans to release as part of a series throughout the year.

In addition to writing and co-composing the songs, Bobby was also involved in directing the music videos for both tracks on the album. S.i.R marks the debut music project from an iKon member after the group's transition to their new label, 143 Entertainment.

== Background and release ==
On March 1, 2023, 143 Entertainment announced that Bobby's first solo single album would be released on March 21, 2023. This is the first step of a four-record series that Bobby is planning to release over the year.

The single album was released to digital music and streaming platforms on March 21, 2023, along with a music video for "Drowning". The music video for "Cherry Blossom" was released on March 20, 2023. The album's CDs were made available for pre-order prior to the album release, and were released on March 24, 2023.

== Track listing ==
S.i.R track listing
No.	Title	Lyrics	Music	Arrangement	Length
1.	"Drowning" (featuring Sole)	Bobby	Bobby; The Proof	The Proof	2:49
2.	"Cherry Blossom" (벚꽃)	Bobby	Bobby; The Proof	The Proof	3:16

== Charts ==
Chart performance for S.I.R
Chart (2023)	Peak position
South Korean Albums (Circle)	8

== Release history ==
Release dates and formats for S.i.R
Region	Date	Format(s)	Label
Various	March 21, 2023	Digital download; streaming	143 Entertainment
South Korea	March 24, 2023	CD	143 Entertainment
