= XX (Mino album) =

Studio album by Mino
- Released: November 26, 2018
- Genres: K-pop; hip-hop
- Length: 40:27
- Language: Korean
- Label: YG
- Producer: Mino

Mino chronology
The MOBB (2016)	XX (2018)	Take (2020)

Singles from XX
- 1. "Fiancé" Released: November 26, 2018

XX is the debut studio album by South Korean rapper Mino. It was released on November 26, 2018, by YG Entertainment. Written and produced entirely by Mino, the album consists of twelve tracks including the hit lead single, "Fiancé".

== Background and release ==
On September 13, 2018, YG Entertainment CEO Yang Hyun Suk revealed that he was in the process of filming a music video for Mino's upcoming first solo album, working through the night with Mino to do so. On October 26, a teaser poster for the album was released, which announced the album name as XX and indicated that the album would drop some time in November. In late-October, a third teaser poster established the album would be released on November 26. On November 16, the title of the lead single, "Fiancé", was revealed, and on November 20, the full track list and its corresponding writing credits were announced.

On November 21, Mino released a teaser for the music video of "Fiancé". Over the course of the next three days, Mino released a total of three direct message teasers, where he talked about how we was constantly working on the album in the studio and how he felt like he "grated [his] soul into [the] album." The album is also said to be representative of Mino himself and his style. A teaser poster was released on November 25, one day before the album was set to release.

"Fiancé" is a track that has a hip-hop sound combined with trot, creating "a genre that may be familiar or unfamiliar". It includes samples of "소양강 처녀" ("Soyanggang Maiden"), a Korean trot song from 1969. Mino also particularly emphasized the depth and importance of the lyrics. According to Mino, there is no specific meaning behind the title of XX; rather, fans are encouraged to interpret the album on their own. Mino also played a role in designing the album packaging, the concept for the "Fiancé" music video, and the promotional material.

== Reception ==
The album was released on November 26, 2018, in conjunction with the music video for "Fiancé". The Korea Herald commented that "Fiancé" uses "brilliantly entwined retro Korean beats." Meanwhile, Billboard praised the music video for its "mesmerizing aesthetics inspired by traditional Korean culture." The video depicts Mino searching for a woman while he is in either a field, or in a throne room dressed as a Korean king and surrounded by concubines. Mino's role as a king was inspired by the 2012 Korean film Masquerade.

Two songs on the album, "Trigger" and "Hope", were rated as "X", meaning that they are unsuitable for anyone under nineteen years of age.

The music video for "Fiancé" reached ten million views on November 30, four days after its release.

== Track listing ==
The following tracklist was adapted from the official released track list image.

No.	Title	Lyrics	Music	Arrangement	Length
1.	"Trigger" (시발점; sibaljeom)	Mino	Mino; Kang Uk Jin	Kang Uk Jin	2:57
2.	"Fiancé" (아낙네; anagne)	Mino	Mino; Future Bounce; Texu	Future Bounce; Texu	3:27
3.	"Hope" (소원이지; sowoniji) (feat. Yoo Byung-jae)	Mino; 1105	Mino; 1105	1105	4:18
4.	"O2" (ㅇ2)	Mino; Millennium	Mino; Millennium	Millennium	2:45
5.	"Rocket" (로켓; roket)	Mino	Mino; Choice37	Choice37	3:11
6.	"Um..." (흠; heum) (feat. Blue.D)	Mino	Mino; Kang Uk Jin; Diggy	Kang Uk Jin; Diggy	3:58
7.	"Lonely" (위로 해줄래; wiro haejullae)	Mino	Mino; AiRPLAY	AiRPLAY	3:10
8.	"Aurora" (오로라; orora)	Mino; Millennium	Mino; Millennium	Millennium	2:37
9.	"Her" (어울려요; eoullyeoyo)	Mino	Mino; Kang Uk Jin; Diggy	Kang Uk Jin; Diggy	4:04
10.	"Agree" (암; am)	Mino	Mino; Future Bounce	Future Bounce	3:31
11.	"Bow-Wow" (불구경; bulgugyeong) (feat. YDG)	Mino; YDG	Mino; Kang Uk Jin	Kang Uk Jin	3:12
12.	"Alarm" (알람; allam)	Mino	Mino; Choice37; Hae	Choice37; Hae	3:17
Total length:					40:27

== Charts ==
=== Album ===
==== Weekly charts ====
Chart (2018)	Peak position
French Digital Albums (SNEP)	115
Japan Digital Albums (Oricon)	18
South Korean Albums (Gaon)	5
US World Albums (Billboard)	13

=== Single ===
==== "Fiancé" Weekly charts ====
Chart	Peak position
South Korea (Gaon Digital Chart)	1
South Korea (Kpop Hot 100)	1

==== "Fiancé" Monthly charts ====
Chart	Peak position
South Korea (Gaon Digital Chart)	1

== Sales ==
Country	Sales
South Korea	72,659

== Release history ==
Country	Date	Label	Format	Ref
Various	November 26, 2018	YG Entertainment	Digital download, streaming	
South Korea	November 27, 2018	YG Entertainment	CD	
