= Songzio =

South Korean fashion house

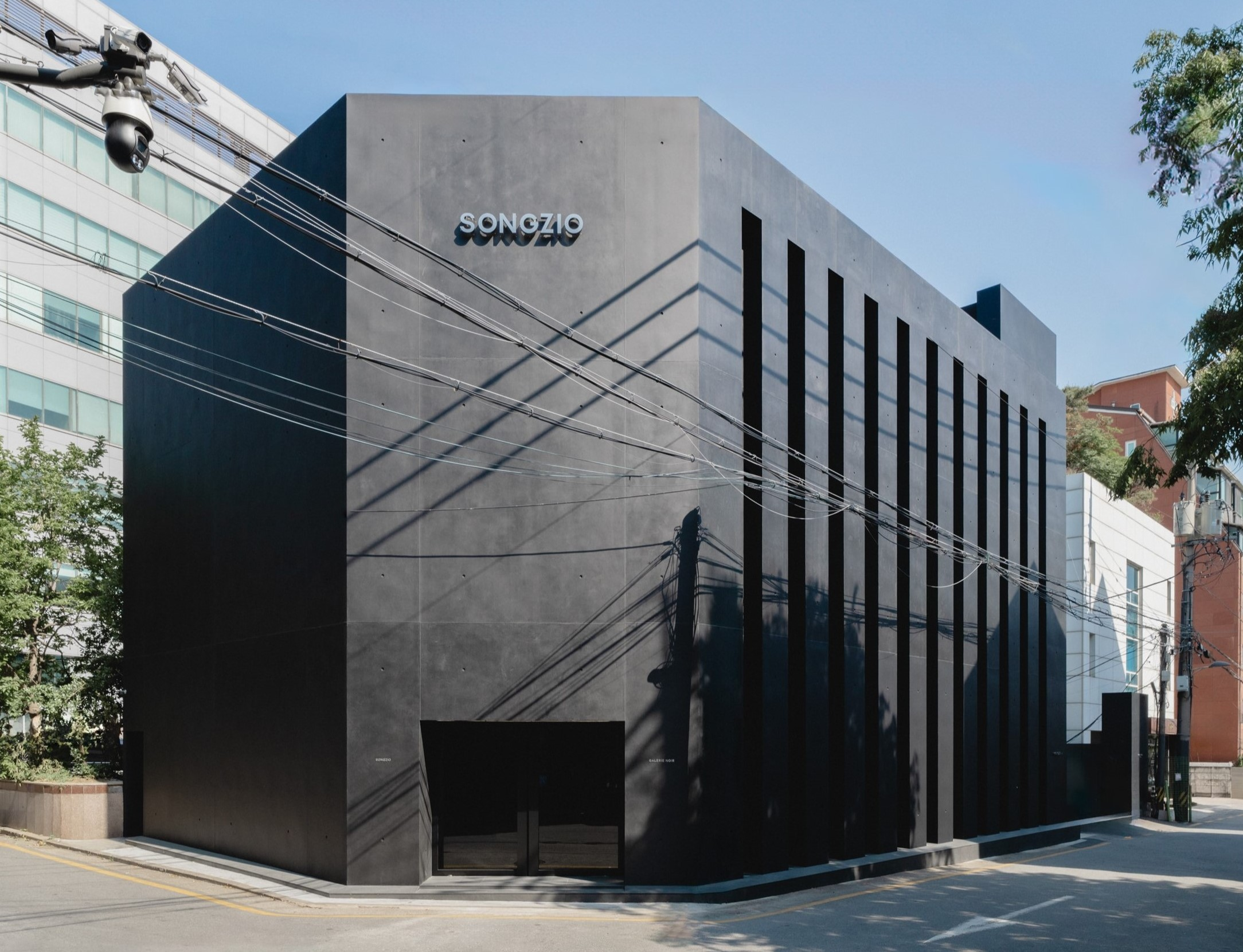
- Type: Private company
- Industry: Fashion
- Founded: 1993
- Headquarters: 54, Apgujeong-ro 42-gil, Gangnam-gu, Seoul, Korea
- Number of locations: 80 stores (2023)
- Key people: Jay Songzio (Creative Director, CEO)
- Products: High-end menswear, contemporary ready to wear, accessories for men and women
- Revenue: ▲US$80 million (2021)
- Number of employees: 300
- Subsidiaries: Songzio, Songzio Homme, Zzero, Ziosongzio,
- Website: www.songzio.com

Songzio is a South Korean avant garde designer house based in Paris and Seoul. Founded in 1993, Songzio is regarded as one of the first independent designer houses in South Korea. It played a formative role in the emergence of contemporary Korean fashion, contributing to the international recognition of South Korean designers since the 1990s. Since 2006, Songzio has been presenting its collections during Paris Fashion Week.

Songzio is known for its artistic approach to fashion, combining conceptual research, architectural volumes, and experimental textile work. The brand draws inspiration from visual arts and Eastern philosophy while incorporating elements of Western tailoring.

The brand expanded significantly during the early 2020s under Jay Song’s creative direction. In 2025, Songzio’s annual revenue was estimated at USD 70 million.

Today, Songzio operates more than 120 boutiques worldwide, primarily in Asia, and operates two flagship stores in Paris as well as a flagship store in Seoul. The house’s distribution network also includes leading department stores and high-profile multi-brand retailers. Its Seoul flagship, Galerie Noir, combines a retail space with a contemporary art gallery.

== History ==
Songzio was founded in Seoul in 1993 by designer Zio Song. From its early years, the house established itself as a major player in the South Korean fashion industry and contributed to the structuring of the local creative scene. It is frequently cited among the leading Korean fashion houses, alongside brands such as Wooyoungmi and Juun.J, which played a key role in the internationalization of South Korean fashion from the 1990s and 2000s onward.

Between 1993 and 2006, Songzio presented its menswear collections during Seoul Fashion Week, frequently featuring South Korean public figures from cinema, modeling, and musical industry including Cha Seung-won, Lee Soo-hyuk, and Bae Jung-nam.

From 2006 onward, Songzio began presenting its collections during Paris Fashion Week.

In 2017, Jay Songzio, assumed both the artistic and executive direction of the house. From 2018 to 2026, Songzio developed and launched several new lines, diversified its offerings, and implemented an international expansion strategy.

In 2024, Songzio opened its Seoul Flagship Space, Galerie Noir, an art-fashion space housing not only its collection but also a contemporary art gallery. In the same year, Songzio opened its first men’s flagship store in Paris.

In 2025, Songzio opened a second flagship store in Paris for its new womenswear line. In the same year, Songzio appointed Seonghwa of the K-pop group Ateez, as its global ambassador and actress Choi Heejin as its new womenswear ambassador.

By the mid-2020s, the brand had expanded from a single flagship store in Seoul to more than 120 points of sale worldwide, primarily across Asia and Europe.

== Brands ==
Songzio is distinguished by an avant-garde approach to fashion, integrating artistic and conceptual references, and regularly presents its collections during Paris Fashion Week.

The brand operates three international flagship boutiques, two in Paris and one in Seoul.

Songzio develops menswear and womenswear collections across five distinct lines:

· SONGZIO, flagship line, avant garde “art fashion” brand.

· SONGZIO HOMME, contemporary menswear brand.

· SONGZIO WOMAN, contemporary womenswear brand.

· ZZERO, unisex youth label.

· ZIOSONGZIO, Songzio homme’s diffusion line with both casual and formal collection.

== Stores ==
Songzio operates more than 120 points of sale worldwide, primarily through department stores and multi-brand retailers. Key partners include Printemps (Paris and New York), La Samaritaine, H.Lorenzo, Closet Case London & Dubai, Atelier X, SUUS, and, in Korea, Shinsegae, Hyundai Department Store, and Lotte Department Store, among others. The brand is also distributed through international online retailers such as Farfetch and HBX.

The house operates three flagship stores: two located in the Le Marais district of Paris, and one in Gangnam, Seoul, known as Galerie Noir.

Galerie Noir is a five-story landmark that brings together several of the house’s lines as well as an exhibition space dedicated to contemporary art. Since its conception, the gallery has hosted 8 exhibitions by emerging South Korean artists, including Seong Lib, Studio Shin Yoo, Lee Husin, Kang Jaewon, Surin, Kwon Osang, Song Dahae, and Kim Byungsub.

== Collaborations ==
Songzio is known for its ongoing collaborations with international creative studios and artists. The house is notably the first South Korean designer brand to collaborate with The Walt Disney Company through projects inspired by cinematic universes of Tim Burton and Pixar.

In 2025, the brand collaborated with international designers and labels, including the Danish design collective Heliot Emil.

A pioneer within the industry, Songzio is also distinguished by its collaborations with renowned photographers from the international creative scene. The brand is known for its frequent collaboration with the internationally renowned photographer, Cho Giseok, who has produced several major campaigns for the house.

In 2026, Songzio collaborated with the hungarian photographer Szilveszter Makó, for its womenswear campaign, featuring the South Korean actress Choi Heejin, Songzio Woman’s brand ambassador.

Songzio is regularly featured in international fashion publications, including DUST Magazine, Dapper Dan, Self Service, and Numero magazine among others.

On March 21, 2026, Songzio produced performance outfits for BTS’s comeback stage, 'BTS THE COMEBACK LIVE | ARIRANG', which was livestreamed worldwide exclusively on Netflix. The project marked a major global showcase for the brand, positioning the performance costumes as a key visual element of the stage’s artistic narrative.

The collaborative collection, titled 'Lyrical Armor', drew inspiration from the spirit of a new generation of heroes who carry the history of Korea within their bodies and souls while forging a new future. Referencing figures who shaped Korean history including warriors, scholars, statesmen, and artists the collection reimagined BTS as cultural pioneers whose reunion was positioned as a moment to be etched into pop culture history. Through this project, Songzio further expanded its dialogue between traditional Korean heritage and contemporary design language on a global stage.

International media notably featured the brand and Creative Director Jay Songzio, including coverage in The New York Times and WWD.
