= MOBB =

South Korean musical duo

- Origin: Seoul, South Korea
- Genres: Hip hop
- Years active: 2016–2019
- Labels: YG
- Formerly of: YG Family
- Spinoff of: Winner; iKon
- Past members: Mino; Bobby

MOBB was a South Korean hip hop sub-unit formed by YG Entertainment in 2016. The duo consisted of label-mates Mino from Winner and Bobby from iKon.

== History ==
MOBB made their debut with the release of the four-track EP The Mobb. The music video for Bobby's solo single, "꽐라 (HOLUP!)" was released on September 7, 2016, and the music video for Mino's solo track "몸 (BODY)" was released on September 8. On September 9, music videos for the collaborative singles "붐벼 (FULL HOUSE)" and "빨리 전화해 (HIT ME)" were released.

== Discography ==
=== Extended plays ===
Title	Details	Peak chart positions					Sales
Title	Details	KOR	JPN	US Heat	US Rap	US World	Sales
The MOBB	Released: September 8, 2016; Label: YG Entertainment, YGEX; Formats: CD, digital download	2	7	7	20	1	KOR: 31,744; JPN: 15,125

=== Singles ===
Title	Year	Peak chart positions		Sales	Album
Title	Year	KOR	US World	Sales	Album
"HOLUP!" (꽐라) (Bobby solo)	2016	9	3	KOR: 219,671	The MOBB
"Body" (몸) (Mino solo)	2016	13	4	KOR: 186,761	The MOBB
"Hit Me" (빨리전화해) (featuring Kush)	2016	24	3	KOR: 163,470	The MOBB
"Full House" (붐벼)	2016	59	4	KOR: 69,630	The MOBB

=== Music videos ===
Year	Title	Artist	Director(s)	Length	Ref.
2016	"HOLUP!" (꽐라)	Bobby	Dream Perfect Regime	3:35	
2016	"Body" (몸)	Mino	Dream Perfect Regime	3:19	
2016	"Hit Me" (빨리전화해) (featuring Kush)	MOBB	—N/a	4:20	
2016	"Full House" (붐벼)	MOBB	—N/a	3:45	

== Awards and nominations ==
Name of the award ceremony, year presented, award category, nominee(s) of the award, and the result of the nomination
Award ceremony	Year	Category	Nominee(s)/work(s)	Result	Ref.
Mnet Asian Music Awards	2016	Best Collaboration	"Hit Me"	Nominated	
Mnet Asian Music Awards	2016	Hotels Combined Song of the Year	"Hit Me"	Longlisted	
Seoul Music Awards	2017	Best Hip-hop / Rap Artist	MOBB	Won	
