= The MOBB =

The Mobb

EP by MOBB
- Released: September 8, 2016
- Genre: Hip Hop
- Length: 20:25
- Label: YG
- Producer: Teddy; Kush; Choice37; Mino; Bobby

Bobby chronology
The Mobb (2016)	Love and Fall (2017)

Mino chronology
The Mobb (2016)	XX (2018)

Singles from The Mobb
- 1. "HOLUP!" Released: September 7, 2016; 2. "Body" Released: September 8, 2016; 3. "Hit Me" / "Full House" Released: September 9, 2016

The Mobb (stylized as The MOBB) is the debut album by South Korean hip-hop duo MOBB. The album was released online on September 8, 2016, and physically on September 23, 2016, by YG Entertainment. The album consists of two songs from the duo ("Hit Me" and "Full House"), Mino's solo song "Body", and Bobby's solo song "HOLUP!". The physical edition adds two bonus songs, "Fear" (MINO solo) and "가드올리고 Bounce" (Bobby solo).

== Promotion ==
The music video for Bobby's solo track "꽐라 (HOLUP!)" was released on September 7, 2016, and the music video for Mino's solo track "몸 (BODY)" was released on September 8. On September 9, music videos for the collaborative singles "붐벼 (FULL HOUSE)" and "빨리 전화해 (HIT ME)" were released. The duo performed their songs "Hit Me" & "Full House" at Inkigayo on September 11, 2016. The duo also performed their solo song at M Countdown (aired September 22, 2016). On September 28 they performed "Hit Me" and "Full House" at a busking on a park in Hongdae, Seoul.

== Commercial performance ==
Upon its release, the album debuted at number one on the Billboard World Albums chart. The album reached number two on South Korean Gaon Album Chart on the first week of physical release and number 6 on monthly chart (September). The album sold 31,744 copies in September. In Japan the album charted in Oricon album chart at No. 47, selling 1,418 copies. On December 28, 2016, the Japanese version of the album was released as their Japanese debut, with Japanese lyrics of three songs, "Full House", "HOLUP!" & "Body". The album charted in number seven selling 7,938 copies.

"Hit Me" debut at number 3 on Billboard's World Digital Songs for the week October 1, 2016. The MVs also had great reception where they land on number 2 (HOLUP!), 3 (Body), 6 (Full House) and 7 (Hit Me) for most watched K-Pop MVs (September 2016) in America and rank at 3 (HOLUP!), 5 (Body), 7 (Hit Me) and 8 (Full House) in the world.

== Track listing ==
No.	Title	Lyrics	Music	Arrangement	Length
1.	"HOLUP!" (꽐라; kkwalla) (Bobby solo)	Bobby	Ricky "Shockbit" Luna; Bobby; Deekei	Ricky "Shockbit" Luna; Deekei	3:31
2.	"Full House" (붐벼; bumbyeo)	Bobby; Mino	Teddy; Choice37; Bobby	Teddy; Choice37	3:40
3.	"Body" (몸; mom) (Mino solo)	Mino	Mino; Future Bounce	Future Bounce	3:19
4.	"Hit Me" (빨리 전화해; ppalli jeonhwahae) (Feat. Kush)	Mino; Bobby; Kush	Choice37; Kush; Teddy; Seo Wonjin; Mino; Bobby	Choice37; Kush; Teddy; R.Tee	3:02
5.	"Fear" (겁; geob) (Feat. Taeyang) (Mino solo)	Mino; Zico	Zico; Pop Time	Zico; Pop Time	3:51
6.	"Raise Your Guard and Bounce" (가드올리고; gadeuolligo) (Bobby solo)	Bobby	Bobby; Prima Vista	Prima Vista	3:02
Total length:					20:25

The Mobb (Japanese album)
No.	Title	Lyrics	Music	Length
1.	"Full House" (Japanese Version) (ブンビョ)	Bobby, Song Minho, Kickhaiku	Teddy, Choice37, Bobby	3:40
2.	"Hit Me -KR Ver.-" (Feat. KUSH)	Song Minho, Bobby, KUSH	Choice37, KUSH, Teddy, Seo Wonjin, Song Minho, Bobby	3:04
3.	"HOLUP!" (Japanese Version) (Bobby solo)	Bobby, KUSH	Ricky "Shockbit" Luna, Bobby, Deekei	3:33
4.	"Body" (Japanese Version)	Song Minho, Zero	Song Minho, Future Bounce	3:21
5.	"Full House -KR Ver.-" (붐벼)	Bobby, Song Minho	Teddy, Choice37, Bobby	3:39
6.	"HOLUP! -KR Ver.-" (꽐라) (Bobby solo)	Bobby	Ricky "Shockbit" Luna, Bobby, Deekei	3:33
7.	"Body -KR Ver.-" (몸) (Mino solo)	Song Minho	Song Minho, Future Bounce	3:21
8.	"Raise Your Guard and Bounce -KR Ver.-" (Bobby solo)	Bobby	Bobby, Prima Vista	3:04
9.	"Fear -KR Ver.-" (Feat. Taeyang (Mino solo))	Song Minho, Zico	Zico, Pop Time	4:10
Total length:				31:30

== Charts ==
Chart (2016)	Peak position
Hong Kong Korean Albums (KKBox)	13
Japan Weekly Albums (Oricon)	7
Singapore Korean Albums (KKBox)	7
South Korean Weekly Albums (Gaon)	2
US Heatseekers Albums (Billboard)	7
US Independent Albums (Billboard)	44
US World Albums (Billboard)	1

== Sales ==
Country	Sales
South Korea	31,744
Japan	14,855

== Release history ==
Region	Format	Date	Label
Worldwide	Digital download	September 8, 2016	YG Entertainment
South Korea	Digital download	September 8, 2016	YG Entertainment
South Korea	CD	September 23, 2016	YG Entertainment
Japan	CD, digital download	December 28, 2016	YGEX
