= Take (album) =

Studio album by Mino
- Released: October 30, 2020
- Recorded: 2020
- Genre: Hip hop
- Length: 37:11
- Language: Korean; English
- Label: YG
- Producer: Airplay; Choice37; Diggy; Future Bounce; Hae; Ian Purp; Kang Uk-jin; Mino

Mino chronology
| XX (2018) | Take (2020) | To Infinity. (2021) |

Singles from Take
- 1. "Run Away" Released: October 30, 2020

Take (stylized in all caps) is the second studio album by South Korean rapper Mino. It was released on October 30, 2020, through YG Entertainment. Written and composed entirely by Mino, the album consists of twelve tracks including the lead single, "Run Away", for which a music video was released alongside the album. Musically, it is a hip hop record that contains influences of ballad, dance-pop, folk, moombahton, R&B, rap and soul.

== Background and promotion ==
On August 13, 2020, YG Entertainment announced that Mino was in the finishing process of the album and set the release date for October. The first teaser poster was released on October 15, 2020, revealing the album's title and release date. On October 19, a 30-second teaser video was uploaded. On October 20, a "title poster" was uploaded, unveiling the title and credits of the lead single, "Run Away". On October 21, a teaser clip hinting the album concept was revealed. On October 22, the track list for the album was uploaded. Mino was credited as the writer and composer for all tracks listed on the album, and many well-known artists such as Bewhy, Bobby and Zion.T participated on the album as featuring artists. On October 26, an interview clip, containing how the producers and artists who have participated on the album saw Mino from their own perspectives, was revealed. Two music video teasers for "Run Away" were uploaded on October 27 and October 28. On October 30, the tracks listed on the album were played partially in the album sampler video.

Mino promoted the album by performing "Run Away" and "OK Man" (feat. Bobby) on various music programs of South Korea such as M Countdown, Show! Music Core and Inkigayo.

== Composition ==
Musically, "OK Man" is a "hip hop song with a fun mix of unique Fx sounds over heavy bass and drum sounds". "Wa" is a hip hop song where "repeated arpeggio piano melody and spatial guitar riffs are used to create a dreamy feeling". "Click / Han River View" shows off the "conversion of two contrasting tracks".

Lyrically, "Love and a Boy" is a song that expresses "a boy who has grown small in the great emotion of love". "Daylight" is a song that expresses "a lover who falls in love after a warm summer and before the cool autumn comes". "Pow!" expresses "the moment when the inspiration in Mino's head explodes with witty lyrics and rapping". "Book Store" started from the idea of "'reading' the other person's expression and heart, and wanting to 'read' the other person's mind too". The song features "storytelling that compares the anguish of a wounded man to a book".

"I wanted to compose my album so that it remains on people’s hearts for a long time, like a movie with 12 impressive takes (scenes). That’s why I named the album Take

— Mino introducing Take, YG Entertainment

== Reception ==
Professional ratings
Review scores
| Source | Rating |
|---|---|
| Vocal | 9.5/10 |

Vocal's Nathan Sartain thought the album "breaks free of any typical pop formulae" and is "stylistically idiosyncratic, yet as easily accessible as the glossiest chart-dominating pop banger". The K Meal writer Kathleen Herrera described it as "a solid album that truly explored Mino's talent as a musician, lyricist and composer".

== Commercial performance ==
On October 31, 2020, "Run Away" ranked at no. 1 on Naver Music and Vibe, and no. 2 on Bugs and Genie. As of November 11, Take has surpassed a total of 110,000 in sales.

== Track listing ==
Credits adapted from the label's official blog and Apple Music.

Take track listing
| No. | Title | Lyrics | Music | Arrangement | Length |
|---|---|---|---|---|---|
| 1. | "Love and a Boy" | Mino | Mino | Mino | 2:44 |
| 2. | "Run Away" (도망가; domangga) | Mino | Mino; Kang Uk-jin; Diggy | Kang Uk-jin; Diggy; Mino | 2:25 |
| 3. | "Ok Man" (feat. Bobby) | Mino; Bobby | Mino | Mino | 2:19 |
| 4. | "Wa" (feat. Zion.T) | Mino; Zion.T | Mino; Future Bounce | Future Bounce | 3:55 |
| 5. | "I Want To" (하고싶어; hagosipeo) (feat. meenoi) | Mino; meenoi | Choice37; Hae; Mino; meenoi | Choice37; Hae | 3:33 |
| 6. | "Daylight" | Mino | Mino; Ian Purp | Ian Purp | 3:38 |
| 7. | "Hop In" (어부바; eobuba) (feat. DPR Live) | Mino; DPR Live | Mino; Ian Purp | Ian Purp | 3:21 |
| 8. | "Pow!" (펑!; peong!) | Mino | Mino; Airplay | Airplay | 3:08 |
| 9. | "Click / Han River View" | Mino | Mino; Airplay | Airplay; Mino | 3:53 |
| 10. | "Book Store" (교보문고; gyobomungo) (feat. Bewhy) | Mino; Bewhy | Mino; Airplay | Airplay | 2:19 |
| 11. | "Sunrise" | Mino | Mino | Mino; Kang Uk-jin; Diggy | 2:43 |
| 12. | "Lost in a Crowd" (이유 없는 상실감에 대하여; iyu eobsneun sangsilgame daehayeo) | Mino | Kang Uk-jin; Diggy; Mino | Kang Uk-jin; Diggy | 3:09 |
| Total length: | | | | | 37:11 |

== Personnel ==
Credits adapted from the label's official blog.

- Mino – vocals, lyrics, production (all tracks), arrangement (tracks 1–3, 9, 11)
- Bobby – vocals, lyrics (track 3)
- Zion.T – vocals, lyrics (track 4)
- meenoi – vocals, lyrics, production (track 5)
- DPR Live – vocals, lyrics (track 7)
- Bewhy – vocals, lyrics (track 10)
- Kang Uk-jin – production (tracks 2, 12), arrangement (tracks 2,11, 12)
- Diggy – production (tracks 2, 12), arrangement (tracks 2,11, 12)
- Future Bounce – production, arrangement (track 4)
- Choice37 – production, arrangement (track 5)
- Hae – production, arrangement (track 5)
- Ian Purp – production, arrangement (tracks 6, 7)
- Airplay – production, arrangement (tracks 8–10)

== Charts ==
| Chart (2020) | Peak position |
|---|---|
| South Korean Albums (Gaon) | 4 |

"Run Away"

| Chart (2020) | Peak position |
|---|---|
| South Korea (Gaon Digital Chart) | 55 |

== Release history ==
Release history for Take
| Country | Date | Label | Format | Ref. |
|---|---|---|---|---|
| Various | October 30, 2020 | YG Entertainment | Digital download, streaming | |
| South Korea | November 4, 2020 | YG Entertainment | CD | |
| Japan | November 13, 2020 | YG Entertainment | CD | |
