= Mino (rapper) =

South Korean rapper (born 1993)

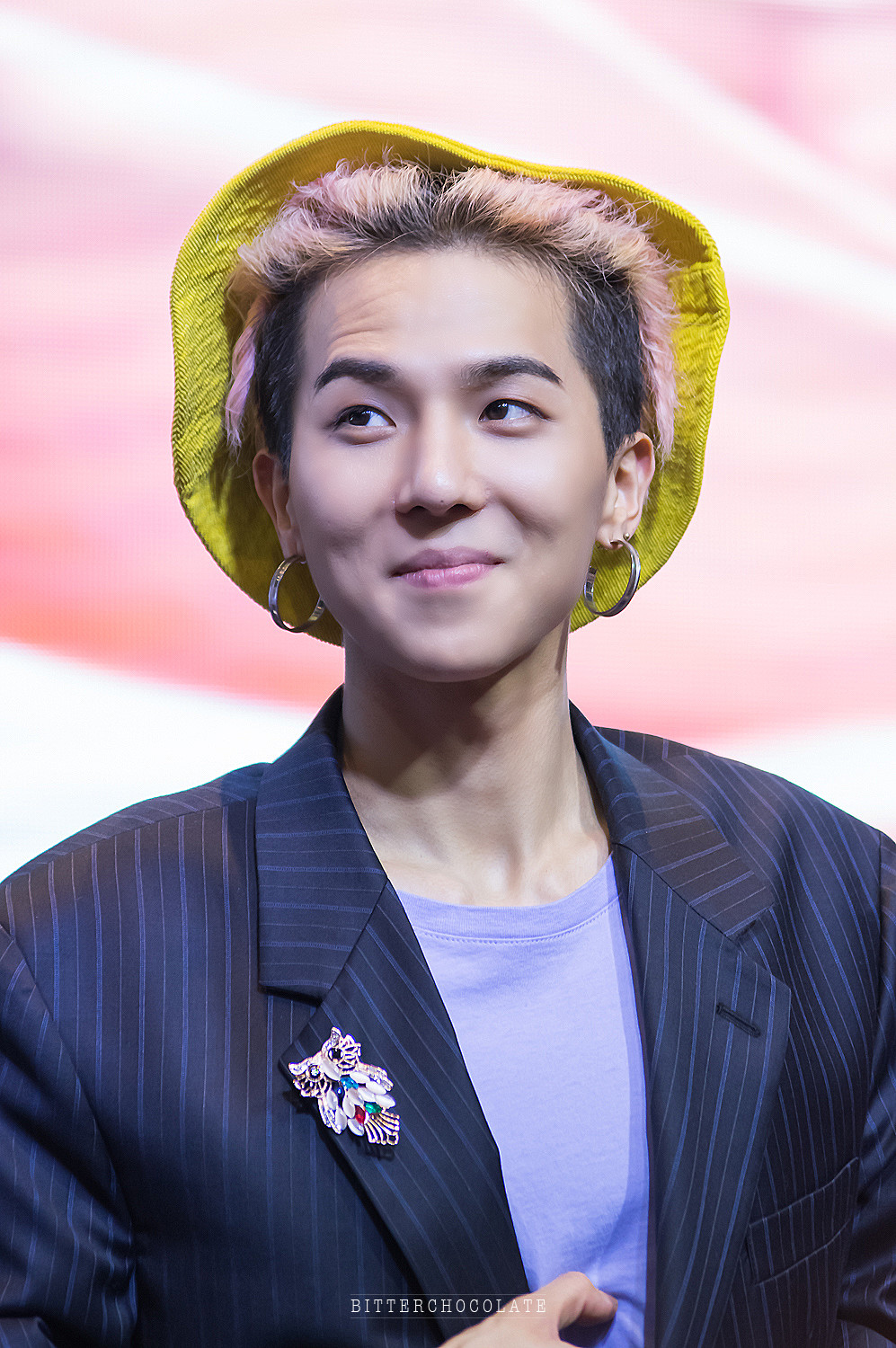
- Mino at Winner's autograph event in Yeouido on April 15, 2018
- Born: Song Min-ho; March 30, 1993 (age 33); Yongin, South Korea
- Education: Hanlim Multi Art School
- Occupations: Rapper; singer; songwriter; producer; artist; actor
- Years active: 2011–present
- Relatives: Gun (cousin)
- Musical career
- Genres: K-pop; hip-hop
- Instrument: Vocals
- Label: YG
- Member of: Winner; MOBB; YG Family
- Website: yg-winner.co.kr

Korean name
- Hangul: 송민호
- Hanja: 宋旻浩
- RR: Song Minho
- MR: Song Minho

Song Min-ho (Korean: 송민호; born March 30, 1993), better known by the stage name Mino, is a South Korean rapper, singer-songwriter, music producer, artist and actor. After a stint in the two-year ballad group BoM from 2011 to 2013, he joined YG Entertainment, leading to his debut in 2014 with the boy band Winner, formed through Mnet survival program WIN: Who Is Next. Alongside label-mate Bobby, he is also part of the hip hop duo MOBB, formed in September 2016.

As a solo artist, Mino first gained recognition as a contestant in the rap-survival program, Show Me the Money 4, where he finished as the series runner-up, and became the best-selling artist among the show's history with his single, "Fear" (겁). He made his official solo debut with the studio album, XX in November 2018; its lead single, titled "Fiancé", became his first number one hit in South Korea, spawning to number one on Gaon's digital and streaming monthly charts for the month of December. It also became his first single to receive a platinum certification from the Korea Music Content Association (KMCA) after achieving sales of 2.5 million digital copies.

In television, he is currently a series regular in tvN variety programs, New Journey to the West and Kang's Kitchen. In addition, he appeared as a judge in a variety show called Sing Again, which has recently gained popularity.

== Biography ==
=== Early life ===
Song Min-ho was born on March 30, 1993, in Yongin, Gyeonggi Province. He has a sister named Song Dan-ah, who is one year younger than him and was previously a member of the defunct girl group "New F.O." Mino also has a cousin named Song Gun-hee, better known by the stage name "#Gun", a rapper who was under Starship Entertainment. Mino graduated from Hanlim Multi Art School in 2011.

=== 2007–2012: Career beginnings and BoM ===
In the early years of his musical career, Mino was an active participant of the Korean underground rap scene, performing under the name Mino or Hugeboy Mino. Among others who would later become well-known, Mino often performed with underground rappers-turned-idols, namely Block B's Zico and P.O, and Phantom's Hanhae. He auditioned and trained under Stardom Entertainment for several years before attaining a position in the line-up for the boy band, Block B alongside trainees Zico, U-Kwon, B-Bomb and Jaehyo. However, due to not being of legal age at the time, his father consulted with the company on his behalf in terms of business regarding the contract and ultimately was unable to reach an agreement. In result, Mino left to pursue his career elsewhere.

Starting from scratch, Mino joined and trained under Y2Y Contents Company for nearly two years before making his debut on July 27, 2011, as a rapper under the stage name "Tagoon" in the ballad boy band BoM. While promoting with the group, despite writing five songs among their releases, the executive of the company did not register nor credit Mino's contributions for copyright and instead forged another person's name to receive royalties. Mino reported that he made as little as ₩10 won ($0.09) during his time at the company. BoM disbanded within two years of their debut in March 2013.

=== 2013–2014: Debut with Winner and rising popularity ===
In 2013, YG Entertainment reached out to Mino upon discovering a video of him covering Big Bang's La La La in his March 2012 appearance on Channel A cable drama The Strongest K-POP Survival. After a successful audition, Mino was accepted by the agency and joined as a trainee. That same year, he appeared on Mnet survival program WIN: Who Is Next as a contestant under "Team A". Initially, he was appointed as the leader by Yang Hyun-suk during the first episode of the show, however, due to an injury part-way, he was replaced as leader by Kang Seung-yoon. Seeing the synergy and improvement in performance, Yang Hyun-suk made the change permanent in benefit of the team. On October 25, during the finale episode of the survival program, Team A was announced as the winners of the show. Team A was set to debut under the name, Winner.

Winner officially made their debut on August 17, 2014, with the studio album, 2014 S/S and the double A-side singles, "Empty" and "Color Ring". The ten-track album also featured Mino's first solo release titled, "I'm Him", which peaked at number 15 on the Gaon Digital Chart. Upon their debut, the quintet shot to instantaneous success with "Empty" topping all South Korean charts including Gaon, earning them the title "Monster Rookies". Their unprecedented success earned them multiple awards that year including Top 10 Artist (Bonsang) at the Melon Music Awards and "Most Popular Korean Group" at the Tudou Young Choice Awards. The group also went on to becoming the fastest act to win on a televised music show, within four days through Mnet's M Countdown.

In October 2014, Mino was featured in labelmate senior Epik High's lead single "Born Hater" from their studio album Shoebox, alongside Beenzino, Verbal Jint, and labelmates iKon's B.I and Bobby. The single peaked at number 3 on the Gaon Digital Chart, selling almost 1.5 million digital copies. The song was later performed for the first time at the 2014 Mnet Asian Music Awards. That same day, he also had a collaborative stage with South Korean singer, IU, performing her single "Friday". In December 2014, Mino co-hosted the 2014 SBS Gayo Daejeon alongside South Korean actress, Song Ji-hyo and singers 2PM's Nichkhun, CNBLUE's Yonghwa, Infinite's L and B1A4's Baro.

=== 2015–2017: Show Me the Money and mainstream success ===
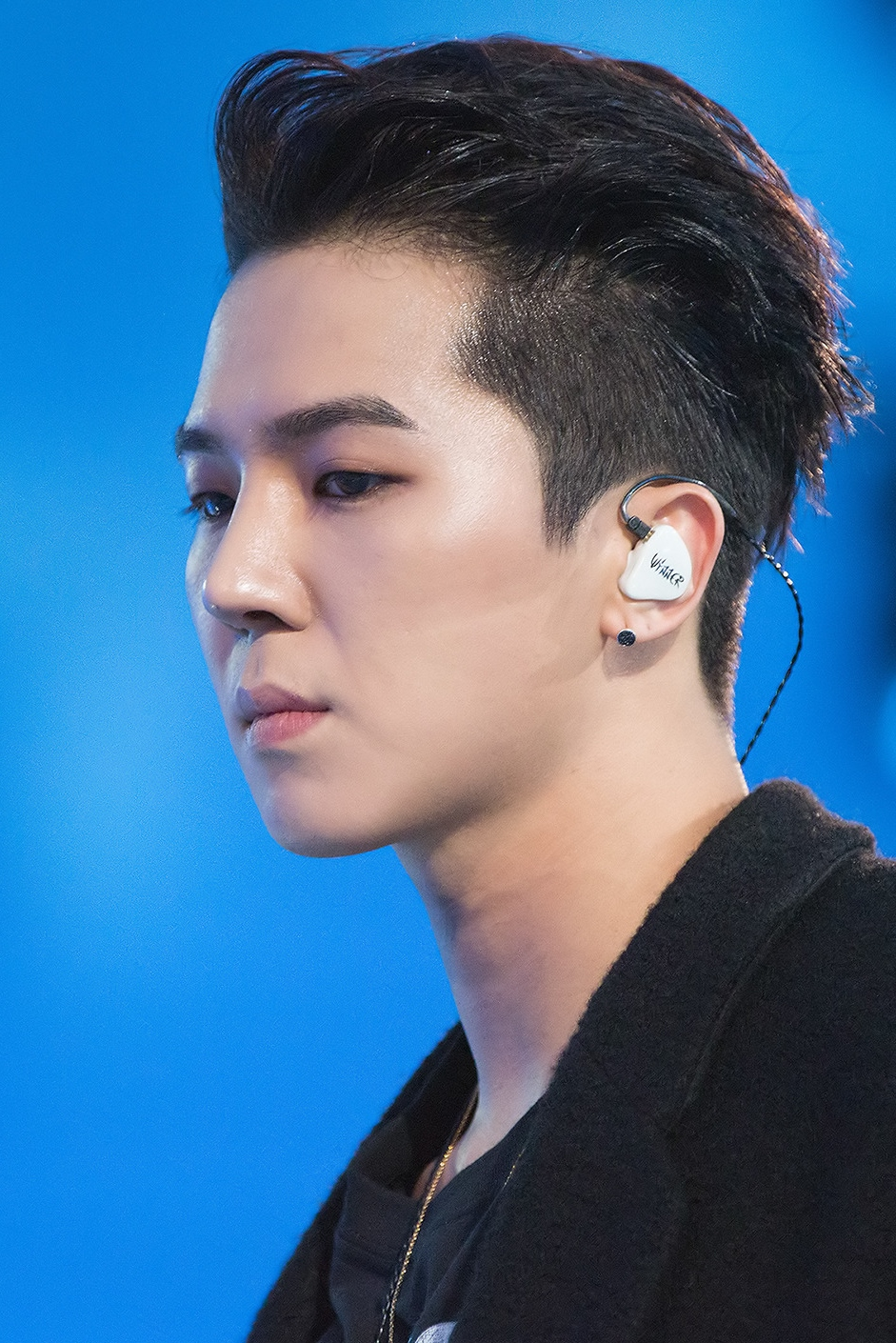
Mino performing at the Style Icon Asia on March 15, 2016.

In April 2015, Mino appeared in the Mnet rap survival program Show Me the Money 4 as a member of "Team Zipal" competing under Zico and Paloalto. He finished the show as the series runner-up behind rapper Basick. Through the program, Mino released numerous singles including Fear, Turtle Ship, Moneyflow, and Okey Dokey. Namely, the single "Fear", featuring labelmate senior Big Bang's Taeyang, went on to becoming one of the best-selling singles of the year, as well as the best-selling single ever in any Show Me the Money series. "Fear" went on to earning Mino the Discovery of the Year (Hip Hop) award at the Gaon Chart K-Pop Awards, and a nomination for the Hot Trend Award at the MelOn Music Awards.

In September 2016, Mino and labelmate Bobby of iKon was formed as the project sub-unit, MOBB. Together, they released a four-track single album titled The Mobb, with the double A-side singles, "Full House" and "Hit Me" on September 9. The Hip-hop duo's success earned them the Best Hip-Hop/Rap Artist at the Seoul Music Awards. Ahead of their release, Mino also released the digital single, "Body" on September 8. "Body" peaked at number 13 on the Gaon Digital Chart and number 4 on the Billboard World Digital Songs Chart.

Through the MBC variety program, Infinite Challenge, Mino was cast for the show's "Hip hop & History Special" alongside Zico, Bewhy, Dok2, Gaeko and DinDin. He partnered with the comedian Haha to create a single that fused hip hop with the history of South Korea. Ultimately, that collaboration led to the single "Shoot" (쏘아), which peaked at number 3 on the Gaon Digital chart.

Outside of music, in January 2017, Mino joined the cast of tvN variety program, New Journey to the West alongside Kyuhyun of Super Junior from season 2.5 onward. His appearance on the show marked his first-ever fixed regular appearance on a television series since his debut. Mino went on to obtaining the infamous names Song Mojiri and Song Garak. On December 5, 2017, Mino appeared on tvN cooking variety program, Kang's Kitchen, a spin-off variety show of New Journey to the West, as a cast member.

=== 2018–present: Solo debut and critical acclaim ===
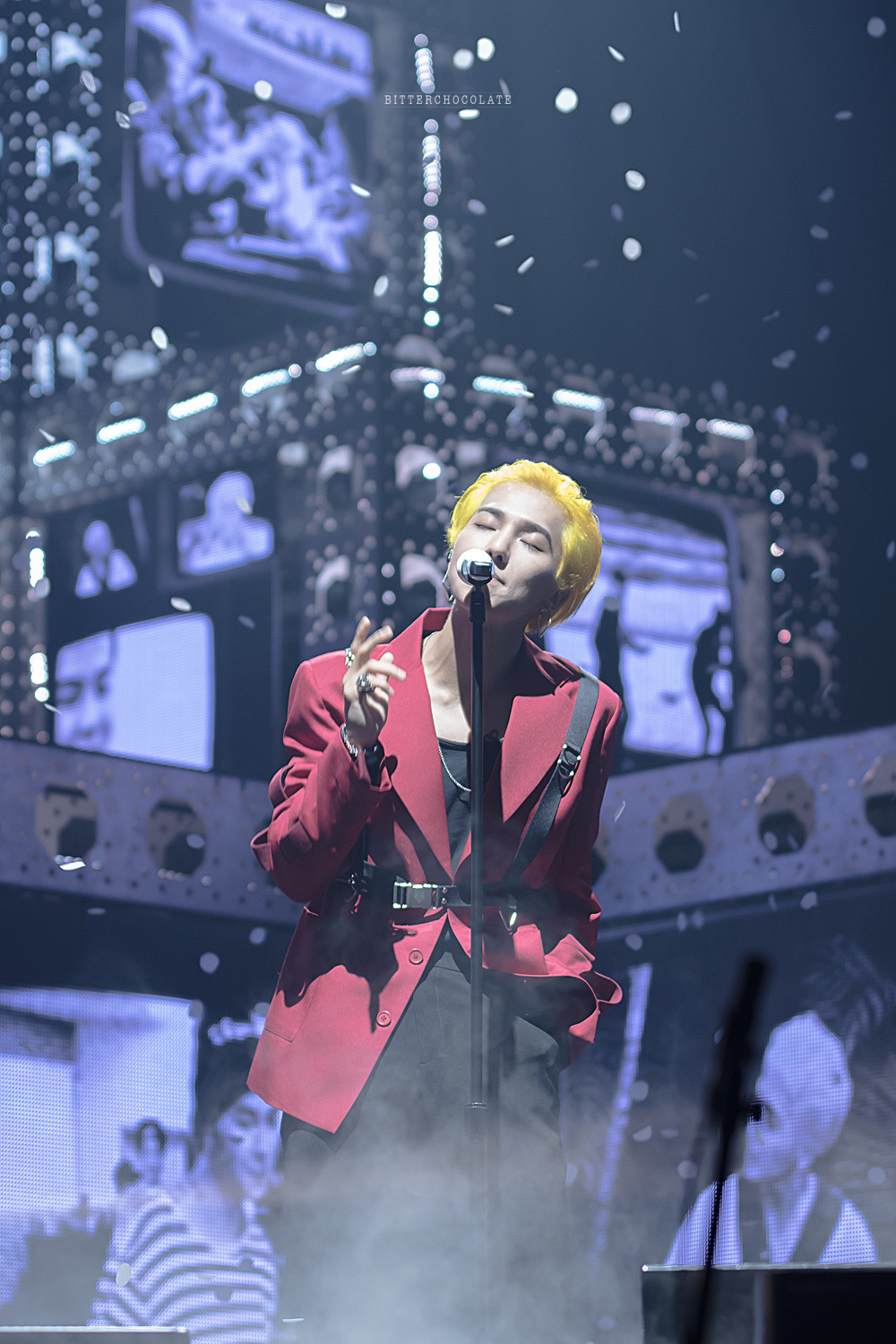
Mino performing at 'WWIC 2018' on June 17, 2018

Through the release of the second studio album from his group, Winner, titled Everyday on April 4, 2018, he released the solo B-side single, "Turn Off the Light" (손만 잡고 자자), which peaked at number 74 on the Gaon Digital Chart.

On July 20, Mino featured and co-wrote on labelmate senior Big Bang Seungri's sub-title track "Where R U From" from his studio album The Great Seungri. The single went on to peaking at number 84 on the Gaon Digital Chart. Mino also made an appearance in the music video, which was later released on July 27, as well as on Seungri's live performance on MBC's Show! Music Core and SBS' Inkigayo on July 21 and 22 respectively.

Mino made his official solo debut on November 26, 2018, with his first studio album XX, and the lead single "Fiancé" (아낙네). He described the song as a fusion of trot and hip hop that samples the Korean trot song "소양강 처녀" ("Soyanggang Maiden") from 1969. Fiancé went on to top numerous charts, including the Gaon Monthly Digital Chart for the month of December. The song also garnered Mino several awards on music programs for the number one hit. His single also earned him the Best Hip-Hop Award at the Golden Disc Awards and multiple nominations including Song of the Year (November) at the Gaon Chart Music Awards. He began promotions through his first music show appearance on MBC's Show! Music Core on December 1 and later achieved his first solo win on a music show through Mnet's M Countdown on December 6.

On October 30, 2020, Mino released his second self-produced solo album Take, with the lead single "Run Away" which peaked at number 55 on the Gaon Digital Chart. This album includes the first track called "Love and a Boy" which Mino wrote, composed, and arranged entirely by himself.

On July 16, 2021, AOMG producer Gray posted a video on Instagram of himself and Mino with "#smtm10 #producer" officially announcing that the duo would serve as judges and producers for the tenth season of the popular hip-hop survival show, Show Me the Money. In six years, Mino went from contestant on the fourth season to producer in the tenth season. Gray and Mino's team was named "Team Graynoma" and included contestants Be'O, Mudd the Student, Anandelight, Geegooin, and Unofficialboyy. Several Team Graynoma songs went on to dominate the South Korean music charts including the team's song Breathe (쉬어) (ft. Mino); Be'O's Limousine (리무진) (ft. Mino); and Mudd The Student's Dissonance (불협화음) (ft. AKMU).

On October 7, 2021, it was announced that Mino will be holding his first ever solo concert, entitled "Maniac" on November 19. The event will be held simultaneously in-person at Seoul's Olympic Hall and online as part of 'YG Palm Stage 2021'. During Mino's solo concert, he shared the stage with Bobby from Ikon and Winner bandmate, Kang Seungyoon. Those in attendance at the concert included Mino's Winner bandmates Jinwoo and Seunghoon, Twice's Jeongyeon, YG labelmates from Treasure and IKon, and Blackpink's Jennie.

After the concert, Mino announced that he would be releasing his third studio album To Infinity and its lead single "Tang!" on December 7, 2021. To Infinity topped the iTunes Album charts in 14 countries on the day of its release. Artists featured on the album include ILLBOI, Gaeko, Bobby, sogumm, and sunwoojunga.

On July 21, 2022, it was announced that Mino would be attending the 'Start Art Fair Seoul 2022' held at The Seoul Lightium, Seongdong District, Seoul from September 1–6.

In August, Mino made his debut with the Netflix film Seoul Vibe, which was Mino's big screen debut.

== Artistry ==
=== Music and style ===
Initially discovering hip hop through 50 Cent, Mino's love for the genre grew after expanding into the South Korean hip hop scenes through artists including Dynamic Duo, The Movement and Drunken Tiger. In result, his entire discography is predominantly hip hop. Mino has also cited American rapper Kendrick Lamar as a musical role model towards his career. For rap, he fancied the husky and rough voices of rappers such as Dirty South, Young Jeezy and Ja Rule which was embodied in his earlier work. Mino recalled how he used to shout on purpose to lose his voice for a husky musical tone. Citing his appearance on the fourth installment of Show Me the Money as a career turning point, from then on he changed his rap tone to something more natural and comfortable.

== Other ventures ==
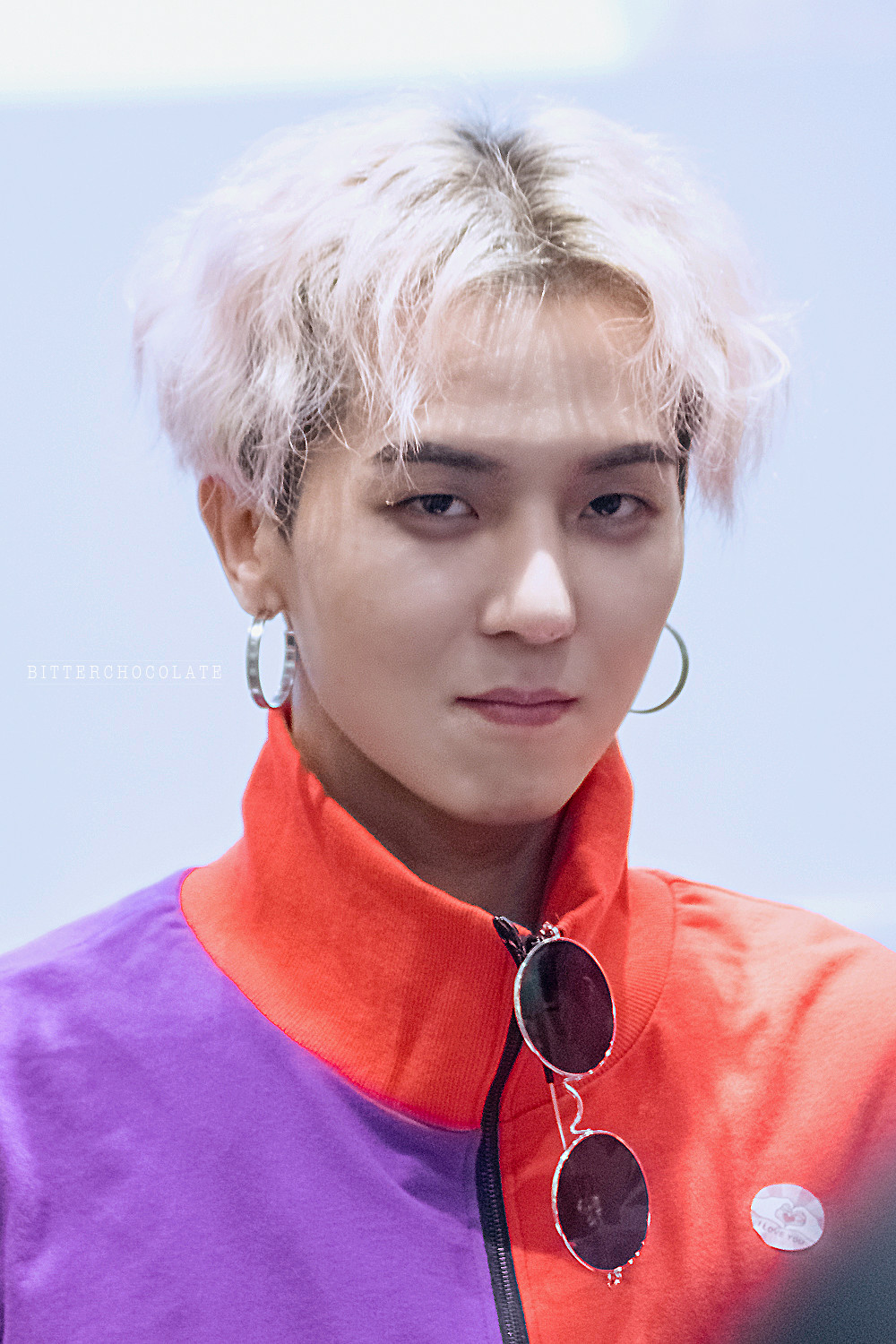
Mino at Winner's autograph event on April 22, 2018.

=== Arts and photography ===
Mino launched an exhibition in early October 2018 called "Burning Planet" in collaboration with Gentle Monster. Hypebeast praised the exhibition's symbolism, and noted the way it portrayed a "burnout" culture where societies literally work themselves to death. Notably, celebrities such as actor Lee Dong-hwi, Block B's P.O, Li Yi Feng and many others visited the exhibition. The exhibition was held for a month.

In November 2018, Mino was featured along with other professional photographers for "O! Leica, Spirit of the Times" exhibition that was held in S-Factory in Seoul, Korea from November 30 to December 9. Mino continued to expand further into the fashion industry as he teamed up with Vogue Korea for the "I AM REAL MINO" spread in the December 2018 issue as guest editor. Along with the spread, a fashion film for the track "Rocket" of his album XX is to be released.

In December 2019, Mino made his official debut as a painter at SEEA 2019 exhibition (Special Exhibition for Emerging Artists 2019). The exhibition held at the Seongnam Arts Center's 808 Gallery from December 17 to 25. He submitted three paintings to the fine art show.

In October 2020, Mino's acrylic paintings will be displayed in Saatchi Gallery as part of the Korean Eye 2020: Creativity and Daydream exhibit in the STARTnet art fair from October 21 to 25. He is the first Korean singer to have his work displayed in this famous contemporary art gallery.

From December 16, 2022, to February 5, 2023, Mino held his first solo exhibition titled "Thanking You" in StART Art Korea's new Sungdong-gu gallery space which was successfully completed with an encore extension as more than 30,000 visitors visited the exhibit from December 22, 2022, to January 23, 2023.

=== Fashion and endorsements ===
Mino alongside Block B's Zico were selected as the models for South Korean mobile game Penta Storm: The Strike Of Kings, owned by the largest South Korean gaming company Netmarble on March 15, 2017. An official from the company mentioned they believed the two fit the games image perfectly as both are influential in the target audience they aim for as well as the two being close friends in reality, further elaborating they wish for users to enjoy with friends anytime and anywhere. Lotte Chilsung, the largest beverage manufacturers in South Korea launched new products dubbed the "Let's Be" Coffee in February 2019. Mino alongside Block B's P.O were chosen as advertising models for the products. A representative from the company revealed their "Fresh and Youthful" image was one of the many key reasons they were chosen. In August 2020, the German personal care brand, Nivea, collaborated with Mino on limited release lip balms, named Red, Blue, and Navy, which included Mino's artwork on the packaging. In November 2021, Mino was selected as the model for the premium vegan brand, d'Alba, and appeared in numerous print and TV ads for the brand. Other brands that have recently collaborated with Mino, and include his artwork, include Scotch whiskey brand Glenfiddich, Italian suit brand Kitson, Danish brand Bang & Olufsen, and camping brand Helinox.

In September 2017, Mino, along with bandmate Lee Seung-hoon, was chosen as influencers most suited to being ambassadors of luxury brand Burberry appointed by previous creative officer Christopher Bailey as they exhibited a "Viktor Horsting & Rolf Snoeren-like approach to haute couture" and named as winning front row looks. The duo got early access to the Spring 2018 collection two days after they landed at Heathrow Airport.

In October 2018, Mino collaborated with brand Gentle Monster in creating the Burning Planet exclusive package that included specialized Peek-a-Boo glasses Burning Planet edition. The package was only available to friends of Mino, and were seen worn by label mates Lisa of Blackpink and Donghyuk of iKon, Kwon twins of YG Hitech dance team, South Korean rapper and producer Code Kunst, and many others.

On June 20, 2019, Mino made his global runway debut and became the first Korean artist to walk down the runway of Louis Vuitton's Spring 2020 menswear show held in Paris, France, during Paris Fashion Week. He was personally invited to participate by Virgil Abloh, the artistic director of Louis Vuitton's menswear collection.

In February 2021, Mino was named as an ambassador for Songzio and became its first-ever ambassador since its creation in 1993. Following the announcement, sales increased by 40% in compared to the previous year for the month of March. Mino increased attention on the brand alongside the awareness of Songzio among the younger generation with their collaboration 'Black Sunflower, Edition 93'.

=== Philanthropy ===
In September 2018, it was reported that Mino donated his entire modelling fee for his appearance in the Balenciaga X Dazed collaboration to the United Nations' World Food Programme, a humanitarian organization that aims for a world without hunger.

Following the cancellation of contemporary casual clothing brand PLAC's 'by YOU' collection showcase event in collaboration with himself and bandmate Seungyoon due to safety issues in relations to the recent coronavirus pandemic, the funds they raised towards the showcase were used to donate 10,000 masks for low-income children.

=== Business ventures ===
In April 2020, Mino opened his own cafe, Osechill, which is currently located in Seongdong District. In September 2022, Mino launched his own brand, Sensorama, which has ring and necklace with diffuser as one of the products.

== Personal life ==
=== Military service ===
Mino enlisted in the mandatory military service as a social worker on March 24, 2023. He suffered from poor health in the past, such as a herniated disc in his neck. Depending on the screening of the Military Manpower Administration, he has been classified as a subject excluded from basic military training.

On December 26, 2024, the Seoul Mapo Police announced they had booked Mino on suspicion of violating the Military Service Act, following a request from the Military Manpower Administration to investigate the matter. On March 31, 2025, the police stated during a press briefing, that Mino "largely admitted to leaving his workplace during service hours". On October 1, 2026, Mino was convicted for being absent at 102 instances at a community center in Seoul as part of his alternative service and was sentenced to a suspended one-year prison term.

== Discography ==
- XX (2018)
- Take (2020)
- To Infinity. (2021)

== Filmography ==
=== Film ===
Year	Title		Role	Notes	Ref.
Year	English	Korean	Role	Notes	Ref.
2022	Seoul Vibe	서울대작전	Galchi	Netflix Film	

=== Television series ===
Year	Title		Role	Ref.
Year	English	Korean	Role	Ref.
2012	The Strongest K-Pop Survival	K-팝 최강 서바이벌	Park Ki-bum	

=== Television shows ===
Year	Title		Role	Notes	Ref.
Year	English	Korean	Role	Notes	Ref.
2013	Win: Who is Next	윈:후 이즈 넥스트	Contestant	Team A	
2015	Show Me the Money 4	쇼미더머니 4	Contestant	Runner-up	
2016	Tribe of Hip Hop	힙합의 민족	Producer	Hidden card	
2016	The Collaboration	더 콜라보레이션	Contestant		
2017–present	New Journey to the West	신서유기	Cast Member	Season 2.5 onward	
2017–2019	Kang's Kitchen	신서유기 외전 강식당	Cast Member	Spin-off; season 1–3	
2018	It's Dangerous Beyond the Blankets	이불 밖은 위험해	Cast Member	Episode 6 & 7	
2020	My Major Is Hip Hop	내 전공은 힙합	Cast Member	with Zion.T	
2020	Friday Joy Package	금요일 금요일 밤에	Cast Member	with Ji-won and Do-yeon	
2020	Mapo Hipster	마포 멋쟁이	Cast Member	with P.O	
2020	Stay At Home Chorus	방콕떼창단	Cast Member	Chuseok holiday special	
2020–2022	Sing Again	싱어게인	Judge	Season 1 and 2	
2021	Spring Camp	스프링 캠프	Cast member	Spin-off	
2021	Song Min-ho's Pilot	송민호의 파일럿	Main		
2021	Show Me the Money 10	쇼미더머니 10	Producer	with Gray	
2022	Things that Make Me Groove S2	내 어깨를 봐 탈골됐잖아	Host	with Eun Ji-won and Kyuhyun	
2022	Around the World at Birth	태어난 김에 세계일주	Panelist / Host	with Simon Dominic and Jang Do-yeon	
2023	Peak Time	피크타임	Judge	Episode 1–4	

=== Web show ===
Year	Title		Role	Notes	Ref.
Year	English	Korean	Role	Notes	Ref.
2022	Saturday Night Live Korea	SNL 코리아2	Host	Season 2 – Episode 12	
2022	[MINO Line] MINO's SEOUL TRIP	N/A	Host	Episode 1–3	

=== Hosting ===
Year	Title		Notes	Ref.
Year	English	Korean	Notes	Ref.
2014	SBS Gayo Daejeon	SBS 가요대전	with Nichkhun, Jung Yong-hwa, L, Baro & Song Ji-hyo	

=== Radio ===
Year	Network	Title	Role	Notes	Ref.
2020–2021	Naver Now	Brrrr Friends	Radio DJ	with P.O	

== Concerts and tours ==
=== Concerts ===
Date	Title	City	Country	Venue	Ref.
November 19, 2021	YG Palm Stage — 2021 Mino: Maniac	Seoul	South Korea	Olympic Hall	

== Accolades ==
=== Awards and nominations ===
Name of the award ceremony, year presented, award category, nominee(s) of the award, and the result of the nomination
Award ceremony	Year	Category	Nominee(s)/work(s)	Result	Ref.
Asian Pop Music Awards (Note: Hosted by the Hong Kong Asia Pacific International Group and Sunway Records, the Asian Pop Music Awards bases its winners on the "Asian Pop Music Chart" which opened in September 2019.)	2020	Best Male Singer (Overseas)	Take	Nominated	
Asian Pop Music Awards	2020	Best Producer	Take	Won	
Asian Pop Music Awards	2020	Outstanding Artist of the Year	Mino	Won	
Asian Pop Music Awards	2022	Best Male Artist (Overseas)	To Infinity.	Won	
Asian Pop Music Awards	2022	Top 20 Albums of the Year	To Infinity.	Won	
Asian Pop Music Awards	2022	Beat Producer (Overseas)	Mino	Nominated	
Asian Pop Music Awards	2022	Best Composer (Overseas)	"Losing U"	Nominated	
Asian Pop Music Awards	2022	Best Lyricist (Overseas)	"Losing U"	Nominated	
Asian Pop Music Awards	2022	Record of the Year (Overseas)	"Tang!♡"	Nominated	
APAN Music Awards	2020	Best Solo for Man (Global)	Mino	Nominated	
Brand Customer Loyalty Awards	2021	Best Male Variety Idol	Mino	Nominated	
Gaon Chart K-Pop Awards	2016	Discovery of the Year (Hip Hop)	Mino	Won	
Gaon Chart K-Pop Awards	2019	Song of the Year (November)	"Fiancé"	Nominated	
Genie Music Awards	2019	The Male Solo	Mino	Nominated	
Global Eye Awards	2021	Visual Culture Global Eye Award	Ohnim	Won	
Golden Disc Awards	2019	Best Hip-Hop Award	Mino	Won	
Korea Fashion Awards	2020	Issue Trend Award	Mino	Won	
Korea Youth Hope Awards	2022	Korea Youth Hope Award (Culture)	Mino	Won	
MelOn Music Awards	2015	Hot Trend Award	"Fear" (겁)	Nominated	
Mnet Asian Music Awards	2019	Best Male Artist	Mino	Nominated	
Mnet Asian Music Awards	2019	Best Hiphop and Urban Music	"Fiancé"	Nominated	
Mnet Asian Music Awards	2019	Song of the Year	"Fiancé"	Nominated	
Mnet Asian Music Awards	2019	Artist of the Year	Mino	Nominated	
Soribada Best K-Music Awards	2018	New Hallyu Hip Hop Artist	Mino	Won	

=== Listicles ===
Name of publisher, year listed, name of listicle, and placement
Publisher	Year	Listicle	Placement	Ref.
Elle Japan	2021	81 Key Person to Lead the New Era	Placed	
GQ Korea	2019	Men of the Year	Placed	
Lyst X Highsnobiety	2020	The Next 20 Cultural Pioneers	Placed	
