= Bobby (rapper) =

South Korean rapper and singer (born 1995)

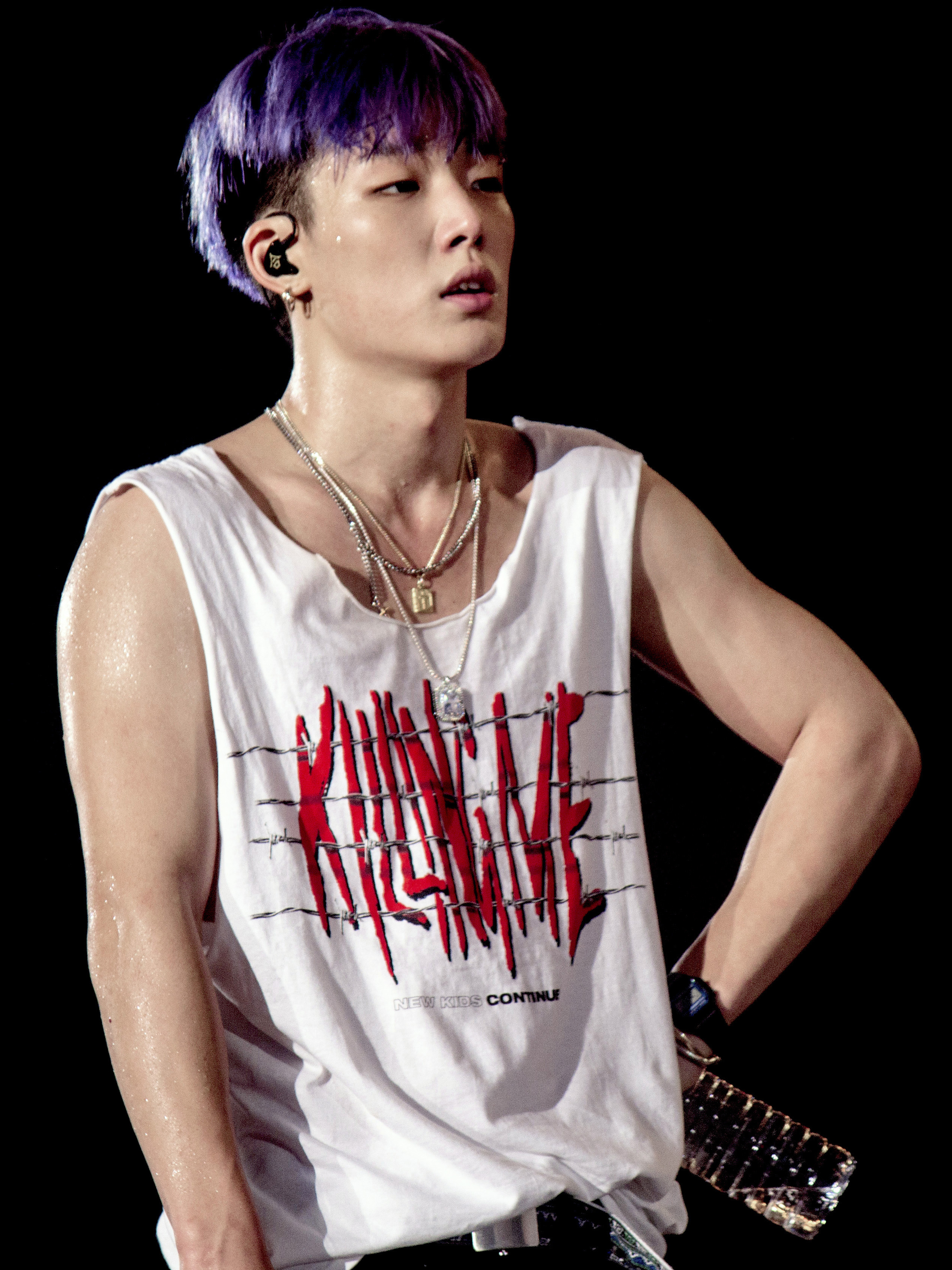
- Bobby performing in 2018
- Born: Kim Ji-won; December 21, 1995 (age 30); Seoul, South Korea
- Occupations: Rapper; singer; songwriter; producer
- Spouse: Unknown (m. 2021)
- Children: 1
- Musical career
- Genres: K-pop; hip hop
- Instrument: Vocals
- Years active: 2013–present
- Labels: YG; 143
- Member of: iKon
- Formerly of: YG Family; MOBB

Korean name
- Hangul: 김지원
- Hanja: 金知元
- RR: Gim Jiwon
- MR: Kim Chiwŏn

Signature
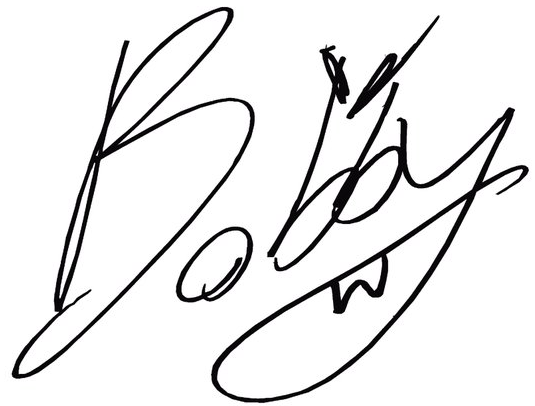

Kim Ji-won (Korean: 김지원; born December 21, 1995), known professionally as Bobby (바비), is a South Korean rapper, singer, songwriter, and member of iKon. In 2016, he formed a sub-unit with Mino under the name MOBB. He is best known for finishing in first place on Mnet's survival show Show Me the Money 3.

== Early life ==
Kim Ji-won was born on December 21, 1995, in Seoul, South Korea. In 2005, he and his family moved to Fairfax, Virginia, where he auditioned for YG Entertainment and later met Kim Jin-woo of Jinusean in New York City. In January 2011, he was signed as a trainee under the label.

== Career ==
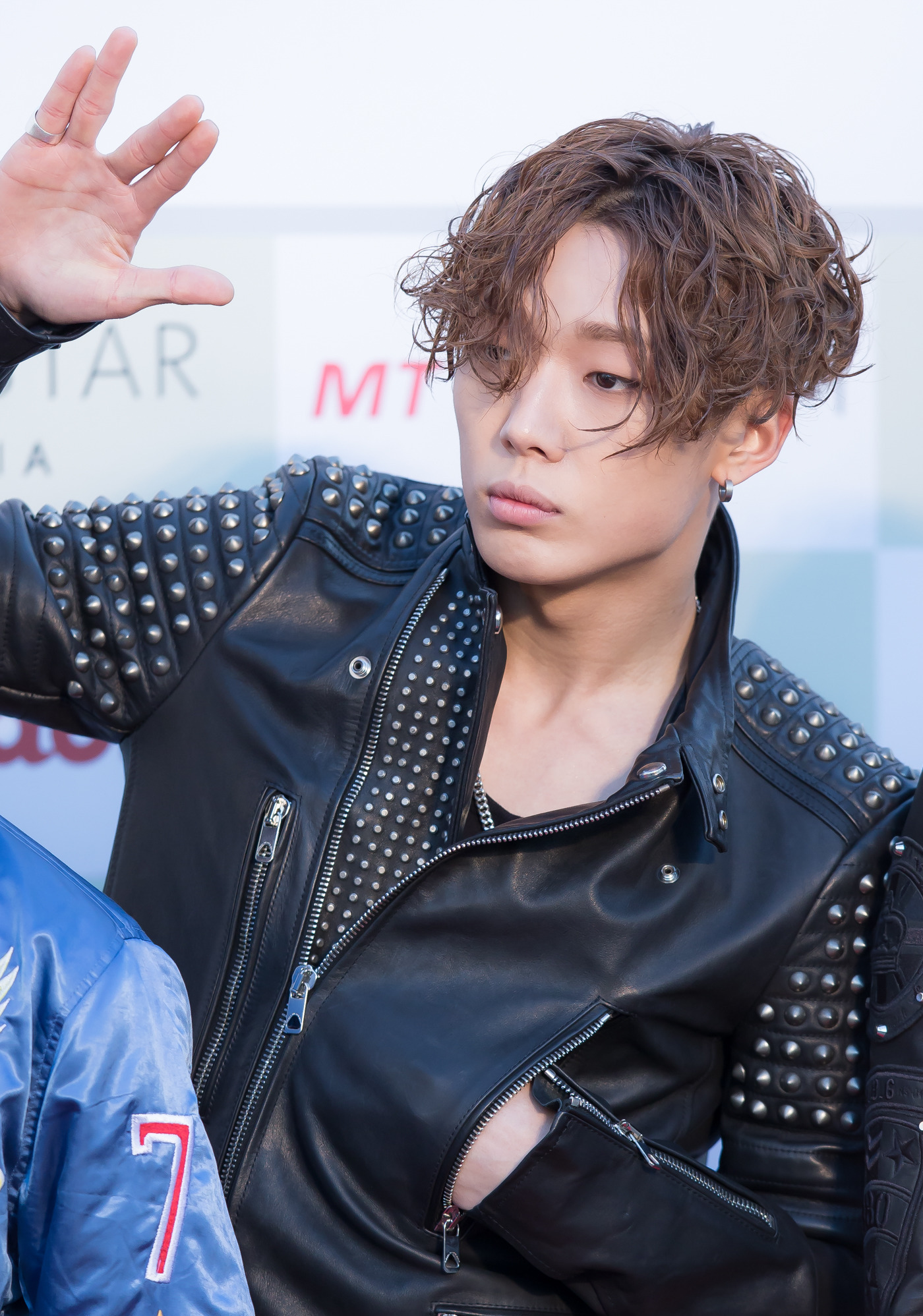
Bobby at the Gaon Chart Music Awards in 2016

After over two years of training, Bobby participated in the 2013 survival show Win: Who Is Next? under Team B. He started using his stage name Bobby, named after his idol, Bob Marley. Because Team A won the program, Bobby continued training under YG Entertainment. In November 2013, while still a trainee, Bobby appeared in the music video for "Ringa Linga" by label-mate Taeyang of Big Bang alongside B.I and Jinhwan from Team B, Winner's Mino and Taehyun, and Blackpink's Lisa.

In May 2014, together with B.I, Bobby competed on Mnet's Show Me The Money 3. He finished in first place under Team Illionaire, mentored by Dok2 and The Quiett. Throughout the show, Bobby released the singles "Go", "L4L (Lookin' for Luv)", "YGGR#HipHop", and "Guard Up and Bounce". Following the show's conclusion, he participated in Mix & Match, where filming began in midst of appearance of Show Me The Money. The show resulted in the debut of Team B, alongside trainee Jung Chan-woo, under the group name iKon.

In October 2014, Bobby featured in Epik High's single "Born Hater" alongside Beenzino, Verbal Jint, B.I, and Mino, and in November 11, he featured in "I'm Different" by Hi Suhyun, a project unit composed of Lee Hi and Lee Su-hyun of Akdong Musician. In the same month, he also featured with Dok2 in Masta Wu's track "Come Here". He performed "Born Hater" with Epik High at the 2014 Mnet Asian Music Awards, also performing "Come Here" and his single "YGGR" together with Dok2, The Quiett and Masta Wu. He was featured on GQ Korea's 2014 Men of the Year list and on December 4, 2014, he appeared as a guest at GQ Party.

In September 2015, iKon released the warm-up single "My Type", followed by lead singles "Rhythm Ta" and "Airplane". On October 4, the group attended their first music show, SBS' Inkigayo, receiving their third win for "My Type". The group released their debut album on December 24, 2015.

In March 2016, Bobby featured on Lee Hi's single "Video" from her studio album Seoulite. Bobby also made an appearance on the ninth episode of Show Me the Money 5, featuring in Reddy's song "Like This", which they performed onstage together. In September 2016, Bobby released the single "Holup!" (Korean: 꽐라) as part of a four-track extended play (EP), The MOBB, a collaboration between Bobby and Winner's Mino under the group name MOBB. They released the lead singles "Full House" (Korean: 붐벼) and "Hit Me" (Korean: 빨리 전화해) on September 9 alongside the music videos.

In March 2017, Bobby and B.I featured in Psy's single "Bomb" from his studio album 4x2=8. Bobby released his first solo studio album, Love and Fall, on September 14, 2017, for which he served producer and participated in writing and composing for all songs on the album. Bandmate Donghyuk and Katie Kim featured on the track "Secret", and label-mate Mino featured in the track "Up". On November 29, Bobby released the Japanese version of his debut solo album. He released his second studio album, Lucky Man, on January 25, 2021.

Bobby released his first solo single album S.i.R on March 21, 2023.

== Personal life ==
On August 20, 2021, Bobby announced in his Instagram post his upcoming wedding to his fiancée, who was expecting their first child in September. In September 2021, his fiancée gave birth to a son. As per news reports, Bobby got married in 2021.

== Discography ==
=== Studio albums ===
List of studio albums, with selected details, chart positions, and sales
Title	Details	Peak positions					Sales
Title	Details	KOR	FRA	JPN	TW	US World	Sales
Love and Fall	Released: September 14, 2017; Label: YG Entertainment; Formats: CD, digital download	4	113	39	7	2	KOR: 39,068; JPN: 1,535
Lucky Man	Released: January 25, 2021; Label: YG Entertainment; Formats: CD, digital download	4	—	—	—	—	KOR: 54,221
Sir.Robert	Released: February 28, 2024; Label: 143 Entertainment; Formats: CD, digital download; Track listing: 1. "Intro"; 2. "Beak" (새) (feat. Huh); 3. "Why Stop Now" (feat. Jung Sang-soo); 4. "Harmless" (무중력) (feat. Chanmina); 5. "Hercules!" (feat. Justhis); 6. "Moon" (feat. IHwak); 7. "Cherry Blossom" (벚꽃); 8. "I'll Do That" (너가 그러라한다면); 9. "Drowning" (feat. Sole); 10. "20s 30s" (2030 머릿속); 11. "Help Me Out o Kill Me Not"; 12. "F"	31	—	—	—		KOR: 12,976

=== Extended plays ===
List of extended plays, with selected details, chart positions, and sales
Title	Details	Peak positions	Sales
Title	Details	KOR	Sales
Robert	Released: October 10, 2023; Label: 143 Entertainment; Formats: CD, digital download	26	KOR: 7,593

=== Single albums ===
List of single albums, with selected details, chart positions and sales
Title	Album details	Peak chart positions	Sales
Title	Album details	KOR	Sales
S.i.R	Released: March 21, 2023; Labels: 143 Entertainment; Formats: CD, digital download, streaming	8	KOR: 30,554

=== Collaborative albums ===
List of collaboration albums, with selected details, chart positions, and sales
Title	Details	Peak chart positions					Sales
Title	Details	KOR	JPN	US Heat	US Rap	US World	Sales
The Mobb (with Mino)	Released: September 8, 2016; Label: YG Entertainment, YGEX; Formats: CD, digital download	2	7	7	20	1	KOR: 31,744; JPN: 14,855

=== Singles ===
==== As lead artist ====
Title	Year	Peak chart positions		Sales	Album
Title	Year	KOR	US World	Sales	Album
"L4L (Lookin' For Luv)" (feat. Dok2 and The Quiett)	2014	7	—	KOR: 467,722	Show Me the Money 3
""YGGR#hiphop" (연결고리#힙합)	2014	4	—	KOR: 1,064,002	Show Me the Money 3
"Go" (가)	2014	16	—	KOR: 402,975	Show Me the Money 3
"Raise Your Guard and Bounce" (가드올리고)	2014	4	—	KOR: 523,402	Show Me the Money 3
"Anthem" (이리오너라) (with B.I)	2015	6	—	KOR: 202,061	Welcome Back
"Holup!" (꽐라!)	2016	9	3	KOR: 219,671	The MOBB
"I Love You" (사랑해)	2017	24	—	KOR: 82,363	Love and Fall
"Runaway"	2017	63	—	KOR: 31,199	Love and Fall
"U Mad"	2021	150	—	—N/a	Lucky Man
"Drowning" (feat. Sole)	2023	—	—	—N/a	S.i.R
"Cherry Blossom" (벚꽃)	2023	—	—	—N/a	S.i.R
"—" denotes releases that did not chart or were not released in that region.

==== As featured artist ====
Title	Year	Peak positions		Sales	Album
Title	Year	KOR	US World	Sales	Album
"Born Hater" (Epik High feat. Beenzino, Verbal Jint, B.I, Mino, Bobby)	2014	3	5	KOR: 1,266,060	Shoebox
"Come Here" (이리와봐) (Masta Wu feat. Dok2 and Bobby)	2014	8	4	KOR: 275,664	Non-album singles
"I'm Different" (Hi, Suhyun feat. Bobby)	2014	1	3	KOR: 936,740	Non-album singles
"Video" (안봐도 비디) (Lee Hi feat. Bobby)	2016	21	6	KOR: 160,960	Seoulite
"Bomb" (Psy feat. B.I and Bobby)	2017	14	—	KOR: 166,479	4X2=8
"Rise (Remix)" (Mako, The Word Alive & The Glitch Mob feat. Bobby)	2017	—	—	—N/a	Non-album singles
"Super Asia" (TPA feat. VaVa and Bobby)	2019	—	—	—N/a	Non-album singles
"Ok Man" (Mino feat Bobby)	2020	4	—	KOR: 114,008	Take
"Lucky!" (개이득) (Kim Jae-hwan feat. Bobby)	2023	152	—	—N/a	J.A.M. (Journey Above Music)
"—" denotes releases that did not chart or were not released in that region.

== Filmography ==
Year	Title	Role	Ref.
2013	Win: Who Is Next	Contestant	
2014	Show Me the Money 3	Contestant	
2014	Mix & Match	Contestant	
2017	King of Mask Singer	Contestant	
2017	Living Together in Empty Room	Cast Member	
2023	Boys Planet	Guest Mentor	
