= Jang Ki-yong =

South Korean model and actor (born 1992)

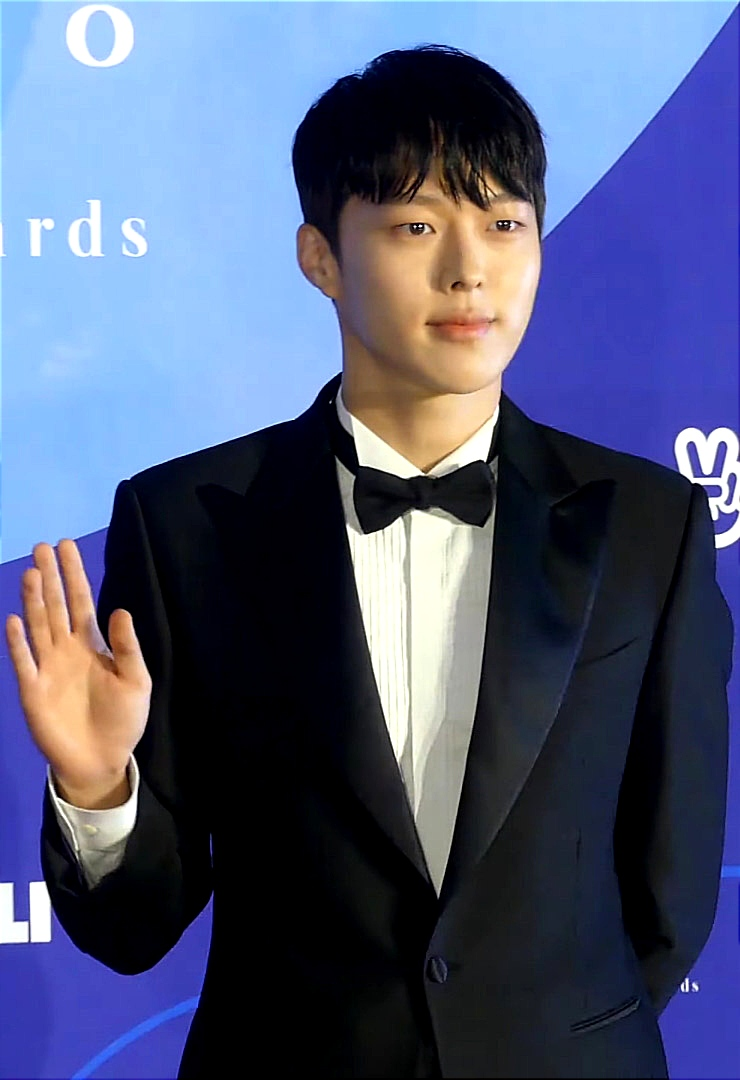
- Jang in 2019
- Born: August 7, 1992 (age 34); Ulsan, South Korea
- Education: Seokyeong University (Department of Modeling and Acting)
- Occupations: Actor; model
- Years active: 2012–present
- Agent: United Artists Agency

Korean name
- Hangul: 장기용
- Hanja: 張基龍
- RR: Jang Giyong
- MR: Chang Kiyong

Jang Ki-yong (Korean: 장기용; born August 7, 1992) is a South Korean actor and model. He began his career in the modelling industry and debuted as an actor through a guest appearance on It's Okay, That's Love (2014). He gained popularity with Confession Couple (2017) and was cast in Come and Hug Me (2018), his first-ever lead role. Jang rose to prominence with Search: WWW (2019) and My Roommate Is a Gumiho (2021), and is also known for his roles in My Mister (2018), Born Again (2020) and The Atypical Family (2024).

As a model, Jang earned several awards including the "Fashion Model Award" at the 2014 Asia Model Awards and "Best Dressed Model" at the 2015 Korea's Best Dresser Swan Awards. His transition to acting earned him the accolades "Best New Actor (TV)" at the 2019 Baeksang Arts Awards, the "Excellence Award" at the 2018 MBC Drama Awards and more. Jang is also known for his endorsements with brands Estée Lauder, Lancôme, and Nivea Men.

== Early life and education ==
Born and raised in Ulsan, South Korea, Jang Ki-yong was born on August 7, 1992, and lived with his parents and older brother. Growing up, Jang developed an interest for fashion and photography. He saw a runway video from a fashion show starring Lee Soo-hyuk on the internet in his third year at Ulsan High School amidst his deliberation of possible future career prospects for college. With his growth in enjoyment for magazines and pictorials, he soon wanted to become a model; however, due to familial expectations, he prepared for the college entrance exam during the second semester of high school. After revealing his dream career to his parents, they were initially reluctant and disapproved of his career choice. Eventually he convinced them to let him follow his dream, to which his father stated: "If you really like it and can do well, do it".

To pursue his dream, Jang went to Seoul after passing the college entrance exam and enrolled in the musical acting department at Yong In University. Describing himself as a "country guy", he often fantasized about the metropolitan city and viewing the King Sejeong bronze statue in Gwanghwamun. 19-year-old Jang visited South Korean modelling agency, KPlus (now YG KPlus) in the hopes of being recruited; however, he was not immediately selected. He returned a year later and was given an opportunity to take a pictorial. Following approval from the company's staff, Jang was signed as their newest recruit.

Jang completed his tertiary education at Seokyeong University in the Department of Modeling and Acting.

== Career ==
=== 2012–2018: Career beginnings and rising popularity ===
At 20 years of age, Jang began his modelling career through the 2012 S/S General Idea Collection Show during Seoul Fashion Week. According to Jang, modelling slowly reversed his timid and introverted personality from childhood. Despite recalling his first year as slow-paced, his credits in fashion shows at the time included Kolon and Caruso, and runway show credits included Loriet (로리엣) and Unbounded Avenue (언바운디드어위). He was also selected as one of twelve promising rookie models by the Korea Model Association. In 2013, his presence in the music videos "The Red Shoes" and "Friday" by IU brought him public popularity. He went on to win the Fashion Model Award at the 2014 Asian Model Award ceremony in January 2014.

Jang was met with an opportunity without the requirement of an audition by the director of It's Okay, That's Love (2014) to appear with label-mate Lee Sung-kyung. His role created a buzz within South Korea despite having no lines and was dubbed the "One Second Cameo". Later that year, taking acting more seriously, Jang auditioned for The Greatest Marriage (2014). While many other actors auditioned for the role, Jang was selected as he matched the role and its image more in comparison to the others. He was also cast in the drama Schoolgirl Detectives (2014). Jang's acting portfolio expanded with his supporting roles in television series This is My Love (2015), Beautiful Mind (2016) and The Liar and His Lover (2017) alongside web-dramas We Broke Up (2015) and Love for a Thousand More (2016), both co-productions of YG Entertainment and starred label-mate Kang Seung-yoon. In 2016, he challenged himself with hip hop after being featured as a contestant in the second installation of Tribe of Hip Hop. His performance to "Doom Dada" by T.O.P of Big Bang garnered attention due to its fast-paced tempo and flow while its execution was praised despite his occupation as a model. Jang finished as a finalist among the top 10.

In 2017, he gained popularity with his supporting character in Confession Couple (2017) as Jang Na-ra's college senior. Jang cited the drama as a turning point in his acting career as he received various offers to appear in commercials and television shows and felt its effects when he was approached or recognized by people in their 40s and 50s. With Yang Se-jong and Woo Do-hwan, Jang was dubbed a part of "Most Popular Actors Born in 1992" and "Rising Super Rookies" by media outlets in South Korea. After its airing, he received casting offers for various dramas including My Mister (2018). Jang chose to cast in the series for its director and writers as well as the character. It also served as an on-screen reunion with IU since 2013. After it aired, Jang gained further recognition with his role as a cold-hearted loan shark. His performance earned him the Best New Actor award at the 6th APAN Star Awards and nominations at The Seoul Awards, marking his first as an actor.

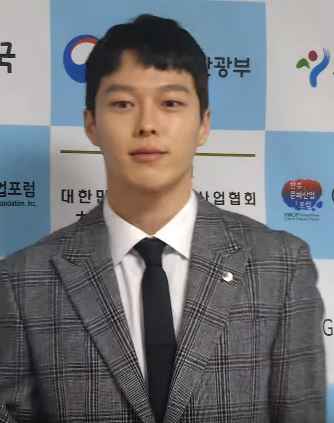
Jang in 2018

In 2018, Jang was cast alongside Jin Ki Joo in his first leading role in the melodrama Come and Hug Me, taking on the role of a detective who has a fated relationship with his childhood friend. His performance in the drama earned him the Best New Actor award in television at the Baeksang Arts Awards.

=== 2019–present: Career breakthrough and mainstream success ===
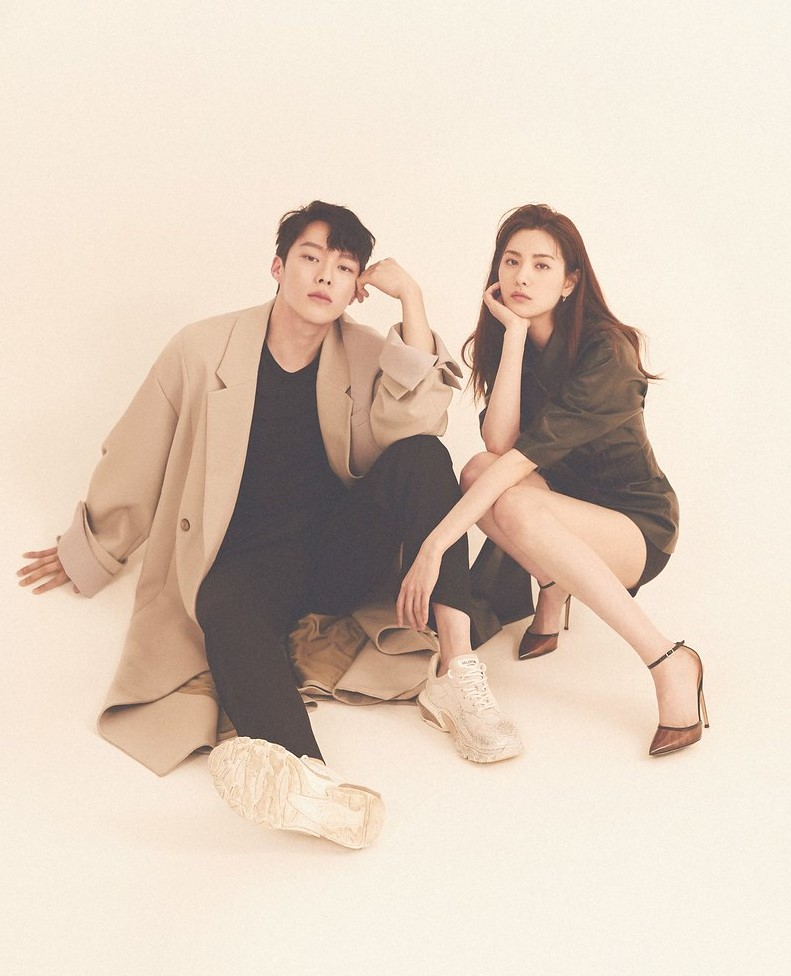
Jang with Kill It co-star Nana

In 2019, Jang was cast in OCN's action drama Kill It, playing a veterinarian by day and heartless killer at night. The same year, he was cast in the romance drama Search: WWW as a CEO and genius composer. Jang made his big screen debut in the crime action film Bad Guys, based on the OCN drama of the same name, which premiered in September 2019.

In 2020, Jang was cast in the mystery romance drama Born Again alongside Lee Soo-hyuk and Jin Se-yeon.

In 2021, Jang starred in the Netflix original romantic comedy film Sweet & Sour alongside Chae Soo-bin and Krystal Jung. Jang later joined the tvN drama My Roommate Is a Gumiho, which is the first iQiyi original production drama alongside Lee Hye-ri, Kang Han-na, Kim Do-wan and Bae In-hyuk. Jang's last project before his mandatory enlistment was the SBS television series Now, We Are Breaking Up with Song Hye-kyo, Choi Hee-seo and Kim Joo-hun, all of which was pre-filmed before his departure in August ahead of its airing in November.

In February 2025, Jang signed with new agency United Artists Agency.

Jang starred in SBS TV's romantic comedy television series Dynamite Kiss opposite Ahn Eun-jin from November to December 2025. He played Gong Ji-hyeok, a team leader at a childcare product company.

== Personal life ==
Jang enlisted for his mandatory military service on August 23, 2021, as an active duty soldier. In the midst of his service, Jang was cast in the Korean republic's musical Blue Helmet: Meissa's Song (2022) with Chanyeol of Exo and Hyojin of ONF, marking his first musical performance. Jang served his enlistment for one year and six months in the 15th Infantry Division ahead of his discharge on February 22, 2023.

== Artistry ==
=== Influences ===
Throughout several occasions, Jang has viewed veteran model turned actor and label-mate Cha Seung-won as a role model in both the fields of modelling and acting since debut. Having transitioned from modelling to acting himself, Jang stated: "I want to be faithful to my main job, movies and dramas, and be able to stand on the runway like Cha Seung-won during the fashion show seasons." He also wishes to break the prejudice of "models can't act", just as Cha has done. Jang also briefly cited South Korean veteran actor, Ha Jung-woo as a role model following his appearance on SBS' Healing Camp. Seeing Ha recall his experience prompted Jang to wish to become an actor like him in 10 or 15 years time. Among actors overseas, Jang revealed the late Australian actor, Heath Ledger, as an influence for his diverse range in roles for acting.

== Impact and influence ==
As a model, his influence extended to model turned actor, Nam Joo-hyuk, to pursue a modelling career. His boost in confidence to wear braces also came through the encouragement of Jang, having also worn braces himself.

== Other ventures ==
=== Endorsements ===
In September 2012, South Korean brewery Oriental Brewery (OB) chose Jang alongside labelmate and winner of the third installment of Korea's Next Top Model, model Sora Choi, as their Cass Light Beer endorsement models and muse. Since then, he became advertising models for brands including Guess Korea, TBJ, Jill By Jillstuart, Philips, and Nepa.

In March 2019, Natuur, an ice cream franchise under Lotteria chose Jang as a model for their products, a first after 7 years following their rebranding. A representative revealed Jang is highly popular among women in their 20s and 30s, which is also their largest customer demographic, thus believing he would be the perfect pick. Various events and fansignings were also taken place. An announcement in May through Sprite Korea confirmed Jang as their newest face and model for both their brand and their Summer 2019 "Dive in Sprite" campaign along with singer Chungha. Perfect World Entertainment 3D adventure and fantasy MMORPG Perfect World announced on October 1, Jang was selected as a promotional model alongside veteran singer Kim Jong-kook and labelmate Rosé. He depicts the appearance of the Elyos Prince, an archer through a promotional video.

On August 31, 2020 Estée Lauder cosmetics skin care brand Lab Series Korea named Jang as its new face for the brand. A representative revealed through the selection process, they believed his image who constantly challenges himself with diverse roles while also pursuing an active lifestyle fits well with the innovative concept they wish to portray.

== Filmography ==
=== Film ===
Year	Title	Role	Notes	Ref.
2019	The Bad Guys: Reign of Chaos	Ko Yoo-sung		
2021	Sweet & Sour	Jang-hyuk	Netflix Film	(Note: Distributed by)

=== Television series ===
Year	Title	Role	Notes	Ref.
2014	It's Okay, That's Love	Sam		
2014	The Idle Mermaid	Kim Yeon-sun	Cameo	
2014	The Greatest Marriage	Bae Deu-ro		
2014	Schoolgirl Detectives	Ahn Chae-joon		
2015	This is My Love	Lee Suk-tae		
2016	A Beautiful Mind	Nam Ho-young		
2017	The Liar and His Lover	Ji In-ho		
2017	Go Back	Jung Nam-gil		
2018	My Mister	Lee Kwang-il		
2018	Come and Hug Me	Chae Do-jin		
2019	Touch Your Heart	Top star	Cameo (Episode 1)	
2019	Kill It	Kim Soo-hyun		
2019	Search: WWW	Park Morgan		
2020	Born Again	Gong Ji-chul / Chun Jong-bum		
2021	Hello, Me!	Police officer	Cameo (Episode 1)	
2021	My Roommate Is a Gumiho	Shin Woo-yeo		
2021–2022	Now, We Are Breaking Up	Yoon Jae-guk		
2024	The Atypical Family	Bok Gwi-joo		
2025	Dynamite Kiss	Gong Ji-hyeok		
2025	Pigpen	Jin-woo		
TBA	Law of Lines	Tak Do-il		

=== Web series ===
Year	Title	Role	Ref.
2015	We Broke Up	Seo Hyun-woo	
2016	Love for a Thousand More	Jason	
2017	The Boy Next Door	Sung Ki-je	

=== Television shows ===
Year	Title	Role	Notes	Ref.
2014–2015	Design Tour Season (디자인스 투어 시즌)	Host	Season 1 & 2	
2014	Tasty Road (테이스티 로드)	Cast member	Episode 26	
2015	Off to School (학교 다녀오겠습니다)	Cast member	Episode 23–25	
2016	Travel Without Manager 2 (매니저 없이 떠나는 여행 시즌 2)	Cast member	with Joo Woo-jae	
2016	Tribe of Hip Hop	Contestant	Top 10 Finalist	
2018	Hope That Bloomed In Mongolia (몽골에서 피어난 희망 한송이)	Cast member	with Jeong Yu-mi	

=== Music video appearances ===
Year	Title	Artist	Length	Ref.
2013	"The Red Shoes" (분홍신)	IU	8:27	
2013	"Friday" (금요일에 만나요)	IU	3:52	
2013	"EyeKiss"	Lovelybut	2:32	
2016	"When in Hongdae" (홍대에 가면)	Hongdae Kwang	3:56	
2016	"The End" (끝)	Kwon Jin-ah	5:01	
2019	"Night and Day" (그대의 밤, 나의 아침)	Brown Eyed Soul	4:46	

=== Hosting ===
Year	Title	Notes	Ref.
2022	2022 Gyeryong World Military Culture Expo	with SF9's Inseong	

== Theater ==
Year	Title	Role	Ref.
2022	Blue Helmet: Meissa's Song (블루헬멧 : 메이사의 노래)	Yeon Jun-seok	(Note: Musical staged by the Republic of Korea Army (ROKA))

== Discography ==
=== Soundtrack appearances ===
List of singles, showing year released, and name of the album
Title	Year	Album
"Some Guys" (썸남) (with Choi Woo-shik)	2017	Some Guy OST
"I'm Alright" (괜찮아, 난) (with Crude Play)	2017	The Liar and His Lover OST
"In your eyes" (with Crude Play)	2017	The Liar and His Lover OST
"Peter Pan" (with Crude Play)	2017	The Liar and His Lover OST
"Paradise Tree" (낙원의 나무)	2018	Come and Hug Me OST

== Awards and nominations ==
Name of the award ceremony, year presented, award category, nominee(s) of the award, and the result of the nomination
Award ceremony	Year	Category	Nominee(s) / work(s)	Result	Ref.
APAN Star Awards	2018	Best New Actor	My Mister	Won	
Asia Artist Awards	2018	Rookie Award	Jang Ki-yong	Won	
Asia Model Awards	2014	Fashion Model Award	Jang Ki-yong	Won	
Baeksang Arts Awards	2019	Best New Actor – Television	Come and Hug Me	Won	
KBS Drama Awards	2017	Best New Actor	Confession Couple	Nominated	
KBS Drama Awards	2020	Best Couple Award	Jang Ki-young (with Jin Se-yeon); Born Again	Nominated	
Korea's Best Dresser Swan Awards	2015	Best Dressed Model	Jang Ki-yong	Won	
Korea Hallyu Awards	2018	Rising Star Award	Jang Ki-yong	Won	
MBC Drama Awards	2018	Excellence Award, Actor in a Wednesday-Thursday Drama	Come and Hug Me	Won	
MBC Drama Awards	2018	Best Couple Award	Jang Ki-young (with Jin Ki-joo); Come and Hug Me	Won	
SBS Drama Awards	2021	Top Excellence Award, Actor in a Miniseries Romance/Comedy Drama	Now, We Are Breaking Up	Nominated	
SBS Drama Awards	2021	Best Couple Award	Jang Ki-yong (with Song Hye-kyo); Now, We Are Breaking Up	Nominated	
SBS Drama Awards	2025	Excellence Award, Actor in a Miniseries Romance/Comedy Drama	Dynamite Kiss	Won	
SBS Drama Awards	2025	Best Couple Award	Jang Ki-yong (with Ahn Eun-jin); Dynamite Kiss	Won	
The Seoul Awards	2018	Best New Actor (Drama)	My Mister & Come and Hug Me	Nominated	
