= We Broke Up =

We Broke Up may refer to:

- We Broke Up (web series), a South Korean web series
- We Broke Up (film), a 2021 American comedy film
