= Sweet & Sour (film) =

2021 South Korean romance drama film

- Official release poster
- Hangul: 새콤달콤
- RR: Saekomdalkom
- MR: Saek'omdalk'om
- Directed by: Lee Gye-byeok
- Based on: Initiation Love by Kurumi Inui
- Produced by: Park Se-joon
- Starring: Jang Ki-yong; Chae Soo-bin; Krystal Jung
- Production companies: KT Hitel; 26 Company; Gyebyeok Mulsan
- Distributed by: Netflix
- Release date: June 4, 2021
- Running time: 101 minutes
- Country: South Korea
- Language: Korean

Sweet & Sour (Korean: 새콤달콤; RR: Saekomdalkom) is a 2021 South Korean romantic comedy film, based on the novel Initiation Love by Kurumi Inui. The film directed by Lee Gye-byeok and starring Jang Ki-yong, Chae Soo-bin and Krystal Jung, is a story of a couple that drifts apart. It was released on Netflix on June 4, 2021.

== Plot ==
Hyuk is hospitalized with Hepatitis B. While the other patients as well as his own parents keep their distance, nurse Da-eun ignores them and willingly takes care of him. As time goes by, Hyuk and Da-eun grow closer with the overworked Da-eun even eating and resting on his hospital bed.

A few days before Hyuk would be discharged from the hospital, Da-eun appears to be distant. The downcast Hyuk returns home. But, being unable to forget Da-eun, he manages to find out her phone number and gives her a call. She eventually invites him to come over to her house, and he stays the night. In the morning Da-eun wakes up to find that Hyuk replaced the broken lamp in her hallway and prepared breakfast for the two of them. Touched by the gestures, they share a brief kiss.

After a while, Da-eun tells Hyuk that she won tickets to Jeju Island for Christmas, and she invites him to join her. Da-eun buys them matching shoes, which he happily accepts, hell-bent on losing weight.

In the next scene we see a slim Hyuk running in the park wearing the same sneakers. A hard working engineer, he is soon told by his superior that he will be dispatched to a big company in Seoul. This means that there will be a long commute from Incheon to Seoul and that if he does well he might be granted a permanent position at the firm. However, on his first day, he finds out there is another candidate; this means that he would not be guaranteed a permanent position at the end of his contract. The other candidate, Bo-yeong, turns out to be very competitive, regularly undermining him to make herself look better in the eyes of their superior.

At a board meeting where the team presents a new bridge design based on a proposal by Bo-yeong, Hyuk points out that there is a critical flaw in the design that would lead to a collapse if the bridge would ever be hit by a tsunami. A humiliated Bo-yeong is told to fix the problem together with Hyuk. While Hyuk leaves early she works throughout the night without taking a rest. At the start, Hyuk takes pleasure in seeing her suffer, but he eventually takes pity on her, and they end up working together to fix the problem. The two start bonding and they continue working on more projects together.

Meanwhile, some strain is showing on the relationship of Hyuk and Da-eun, with both of them regularly working late and Hyuk becoming increasingly frustrated at having to commute between Incheon and Seoul. He usually comes home tired and shows little interest in Da-eun. One night when he comes home Da-eun complains about him not having fixed the broken light bulb and his refusal to take out the trash. When they start arguing she tells him that she hasn't had her period, and it turns out that she is expecting his child, which she aborts later on.

Rather than being pleased, it seemed to frustrate Hyuk even more. As he realizes he has feelings for Bo-yeong, he starts to distance himself from her and focuses on Da-eun. However, this eventually starts to impact his work. Bo-yeong confronts him and tells him that both of their performance will suffer. Hyuk agrees to work late, and he starts doing overtime again, leaving Da-eun alone at home.

One evening, Da-eun and Hyuk were seen going out together. Hyuk shows no interest in spending time with Da-eun and continuously complains about the crowd and repeatedly says that he wants to eat and go home. Back in the car Da-eun complains that Hyuk never wants to spend time with her anymore. Hyuk brushes it off and accidentally calls her his "pretty Bo-yeong". They get into a big argument in which he denies Da-eun's claims that he's cheating on her. He eventually drops her off at their once shared house as he drives off in a fury.

Back in Seoul, Bo-yeong and Hyuk are once again working overtime. With all their time spent together and the gradually growing sexual tension between both of them, Hyuk kisses Bo-yeong. Both of them eventually get romantically involved. After a while, Hyuk becomes restless and appears to be longing for Da-eun again. When neither Bo-yeong or himself is offered a permanent position by the firm, Hyuk tells Bo-yeong at the firm's team dinner that he will return to his previous position in Incheon. She in turn tells him that she will study abroad as her old job is also not a permanent contract. In the background the team manager announces that they can win a free Christmas trip to Jeju.

Hyuk hearing this thinks of the Jeju trip he was supposed to go on with Da-eun that Christmas. Coincidentally, their flight was meant to be that very evening. Realizing he still loves Da-eun, he rushes to the airport in a taxi. As he pulls up at the airport, he sees Da-eun standing on the sidewalk in front of the airport building. Jumping out of the taxi, he sees her supposedly waving at him. He runs towards her but bumps into someone and falls over.

The man he ran into turns out to be the Hyuk shown in the first part of the film. The scene is the same one from earlier when Da-eun gave the matching pair of sneakers. It is revealed that the Hyuk from the start of the film is a different Hyuk than the one from the main part of the film. Both storylines happened simultaneously, and it turns out Da-eun bonded with Hyuk while she felt neglected by her partner Jang-Hyuk and because he did all the things Jang-Hyuk didn't do, such as fixing the light bulb. Both of them leave on the trip for Jeju while Jang-Hyuk returns to the party in shock. Bo-yeong later reveals to him that she had just won the Christmas trip to Jeju and that they could go together. Despite his feelings for Da-eun, he tells Bo-yeong he loves her but she rejects his feeling saying she doesn't feel the same way.

== Cast ==
- Jang Ki-yong as Jang-hyuk
- Chae Soo-bin as Da-eun
- Krystal Jung as Han Bo-yeong

=== Supporting ===
- Lee Woo-je as Lee Jang-Hyuk, admitted as patient of Hepatitis B in hospital, Da-eun nursed him
- Choi Hwan-yi as Jo Yeon-hwan
- Shin Joon-hang as Team 2 member 4
- Park Chul-min as Jang-hyuk and Bo-yeong's boss
- Yeo Min-joo
- Park Ji-hoon as Macaron
- Yoon Byung-hee as patient

=== Guest appearance ===
- Lee Geung-young as janitor of office building
- Yoo Sun
- Choi-hyeong as Emergency room doctor
- Kim Mi-hye as Nurse 2
- Ahn Gil-kang as Lee Jang-hyuk's father
- Kim Mi-kyung as Lee Jang-hyuk's mother

== Production ==
=== Casting ===
On 9 September 2019, Chae Soo-bin and Jang Ki-yong were confirmed to play lead roles in the film. On October 8, 2019 Krystal Jung joined the cast as parallel lead in the film.

=== Filming ===
Principal photography began on October 8, 2019, and filming was wrapped up on December 23, 2019.

== Release ==
The film was originally planned to be released theatrically in 2020 but got affected by COVID-19 pandemic spread. It was ultimately released on Netflix on June 4, 2021.

== Reception ==
Nam Seon-woo writing for Cine21 wrote that the charm of actors and the director's directing ability was evident in the comedy scenes. Seon-woo opined that as the characters of the film are presented in working environment commuting scenes were frequently shown. Instability and tiring work environment were shown to affect relationship. All this brought the term 'Romance from a fatigue society' to the fore. Concluding write up Seon-woo wrote, ".... the essence of the film unfolds in the last ten minutes. And those 10 minutes may make you re-watch the movie from the beginning." Rhian Daly reviewing for NME rated the film with 3 stars out of five and felt that the film was unimpressive as it could not capture the pain of love. Daly opined that the plot of film didn't have feelings. Rhian concluded, the film just portrayed impact of pressures of work life in modern day-to-day existence but lacked deeper and moving emotions. Alicja Johnson reviewing for Mediaversity graded the film with 3.25 out of 5 stars and wrote, "Despite the alluring screen presence of its actors, Sweet & Sour offers little in the way of progress on gender and diverse body representation."
