= Touch Your Heart =

2019 South Korean television series

- Promotional poster
- Hangul: 진심이 닿다
- Lit.: Reach of Sincerity
- RR: Jinsimi data
- MR: Chinsimi tat'a
- Genre: Romantic comedy
- Based on: Reach of Sincerity by Jäger
- Developed by: Studio Dragon (planning)
- Written by: Lee Myung-suk; Choi Bo-rim
- Directed by: Park Joon-hwa
- Starring: Yoo In-na; Lee Dong-wook
- Theme music composer: Seo Sung-won; Lee Jong-soo
- Country of origin: South Korea
- Original language: Korean
- No. of episodes: 16

Production
- Executive producers: Jang Jung-do; Lee Jun-ho; Han Suk-won
- Producer: Jung Da-hyung
- Editor: Oh Dong-hee
- Running time: 60 minutes
- Production companies: Mega Monster; Zium Content (Note: now HighZium Studio)

Original release
- Network: tvN
- Release: February 6 – March 28, 2019

Touch Your Heart (Korean: 진심이 닿다) is a 2019 South Korean television series starring Yoo In-na and Lee Dong-wook. It is based on the web novel of the same name, which was first published in 2016 on KakaoPage. It aired on tvN from February 6 to March 28, 2019.

== Synopsis ==
Top actress Oh Jin-shim (Yoo In-na), who goes by the stage name Oh Yoon-seo, has a scandal that damages her career, leaving her jobless for two years until she has a chance to earn a major role in an upcoming drama. However, in order to clear her name and secure success, she must first take a job working as a secretary to a lawyer named Kwon Jung-rok (Lee Dong-wook). Eventually, they fall in love and the events following form the crux of the story.

== Cast ==
=== Main ===
- Yoo In-na as Oh Jin-shim / Oh Yoon-seo (stage name), a top star who loses her fame after getting embroiled in a drug scandal with a third-generation chaebol. In order to make a comeback by starring in a famous writer's project, she gets field experience in law by posing as Jung-rok's secretary.
- Lee Dong-wook as Kwon Jung-rok, a workaholic elite lawyer who always wins his cases and cares deeply about his firm's reputation.
- Lee Sang-woo as Kim Se-won, Jung-rok's best friend who is an elite prosecutor.
- Son Seong-yoon as Yoo Yeo-reum, a prosecutor, whom Jung-rok had a crush on. She and Se-won dated in university, but he broke her heart.

=== Supporting ===
==== Always Law Firm ====
- Oh Jung-se as Yeon Joon-kyu, the CEO of Always Law Firm. An ardent fan of Yoon-seo.
- Shim Hyung-tak as Choi Yoon-hyuk, a divorce lawyer.
- Park Kyung-hye as Dan Moon-hee, a straightforward and honest civil defense lawyer.
- Park Ji-hwan as Lee Doo-seob, a paralegal and former detective.
- Jang So-yeon as Yang Eun-ji, a legal secretary with ten years of experience.
- Kim Hee-jung as Kim Hae-young, an assistant legal secretary. She has great interest in everyone's private lives.
- Lee Jong-hwa as Lee Jong-hwa, an intern lawyer who is a fan of Jin-shim.
- Lee Kyu-sung as Kim Pil-gi, an intern lawyer who is a fan of Jin-shim.

==== People around Jin-shim ====
- Lee Jun-hyeok as Yeon Joon-suk, the CEO of Yeon Entertainment, Jin-shim's agency, who discovered and made her an actress.
- Oh Eui-shik as Kong Hyuk-joon, Jin-shim's manager of ten years. He is very loyal and considers Jim-shim as his younger sister.
- Jay Kim as Lee Kang-joon, a chaebol heir and Jin-shim's stalker.

==== Seoul District Prosecutor Office ====
- Kim Chae-eun as Lee Joo-young, Se-won's junior.
- Lee Hyun-kyun as Prosecutor Im, Yeo-reum's senior who often puts her down.
- Kim Koo-taek as a prosecutor and Yeo-reum's boss
- Kim Hee-chang as a chief prosecutor
- Na Chul as Kim Hyung-shik from Se-won's team
- Park Yun as Yoo Hyun-ji from Se-won's team
- Jin So-yeon as Yeo-reum's legal secretary
- Min Jung-seob as Yeo-reum's investigator

=== Others ===
- Kim Soo-jin as Lee Se-jin, the writer of the drama that Jin-shim wants to star in.
- Kim Dae-gon as Park Soo-myung
- Son Se-bin as Kim Min-ji, Jin-shim's rival.
- Yoo Eun-mi as Seo Jin-hee, Eun-ji's daughter.
- Song Duk-ho as Deok-ho
- Baek Eun-hye as Insurance agent
- Yoo Yeon as Im Yoon-hee

=== Special appearances ===
- Park Seul-gi as a host (Ep. 1)
- Jang Ki-yong as an actor (Ep. 1)
- Hong Seo-joon as Moon-hee's client (Ep. 1)
- Lee Yoon-sang as a judge (Ep. 1, 5–6)
- Kim Ki-moo as an angry driver (Ep. 2)
- Kim Kyung-ryong as Jung-rok's client (Ep. 2)
- Park Yong as Moon-hee's client (Ep. 2)
- Kim Kwan-soo as a Subway part-timer (Ep. 2, 8, 10)
- Jo Soo-min as Kim Yoon-ha, Jung-rok's client (Ep. 3)
- Hwang Chan-sung as a delivery man (Ep. 3 & 5)
- Hwang Seung-eon as an actress (Ep. 4)
- Kim Wook as an actor (Ep. 4)
- Lee Yoo-mi as Seung-hee, Jung-rok's client (Ep. 4)
- Seol Chang-hee as Seung-hee's ex-boyfriend (Ep. 4)
- Hwang Bo-ra as Hwang Yeon-du, Jin-shim's senior and rival (Ep. 7)
- Jeon Shin-hwan as a café owner (Ep. 8)
- Park Ji-il as Kwon Jae-bok, Jung-rok's father (Ep. 10)
- Song Kang as a deliveryman (Ep. 13)
- Seo Kwang-jae as a judge (Ep. 13)
- Moon Ji-hoo as himself portraying the male lead Jeong-do in Lee Se-jin's new drama (Ep. 15)
- Seo Ji-seung as Jung-rok's blind date (Ep. 16)

== Production ==
- Lead stars Yoo In-na and Lee Dong-wook previously worked together in 2016 series Guardian: The Lonely and Great God.
- The male lead role was first offered to Jung Kyung-ho.
- The first script reading of the cast was held on November 27, 2018, at Studio Dragon's head office in Sangam-dong, Seoul; and filming started in the same month.
- Actor Shin Dong-wook was originally cast for the role of Kim Se-won, but later stepped down from the series amidst controversies surrounding fraud claims and a subsequent lawsuit. He was replaced by actor Lee Sang-woo.

== Original soundtrack ==
Touch Your Heart OST

Soundtrack album by Various artists
- Recorded: 2019
- Genre: Soundtrack
- Languages: Korean; English
- Labels: Jellyfish; Kakao M

=== Part 1 ===
Released on February 7, 2019
No.	Title	Lyrics	Music	Artist	Length
1.	"Make It Count"	ZigZag Note, Kang Myung-shin, moonc	ZigZag Note, Kang Myung-shin, moonc	Chen (EXO)	3:27
2.	"Make It Count" (Inst.)		ZigZag Note, Kang Myung-shin, moonc		3:27
Total length:					6:54

=== Part 2 ===
Released on February 14, 2019
No.	Title	Lyrics	Music	Artist	Length
1.	"Oh? Truly!" (Oh? 진심!)	J Rabbit	Jung Da-woon	J Rabbit	2:42
2.	"Oh? Truly!" (Inst.)		Jung Da-woon		2:42
Total length:					5:24

=== Part 3 ===
Released on February 22, 2019
No.	Title	Lyrics	Music	Artist	Length
1.	"What If Love"	Baek Chan	Baek Chan; DJ Kayvon	Wendy (Red Velvet)	3:41
2.	"What If Love" (Inst.)		Baek Chan; DJ Kayvon		3:41
Total length:					7:22

=== Part 4 ===
Released on February 28, 2019
No.	Title	Lyrics	Music	Artist	Length
1.	"Be Your Star" (마음을 담아)	Lee Jong-soo; Na Byung-soo	Lee Jong-soo; Na Byung-soo	Seoryoung, Lena (GWSN)	4:01
2.	"Be Your Star" (Inst.)		Lee Jong-soo; Na Byung-soo		4:01
Total length:					8:02

=== Part 5 ===
Released on March 7, 2019
No.	Title	Lyrics	Music	Artist	Length
1.	"Good Night"	Jae; Wonpil	Jae; Wonpil; MAJORCODE; Moon Ssng-sun	Jeong Se-woon	4:00
2.	"Good Night" (Inst.)		Jae; Wonpil; MAJORCODE; Moon Ssng-sun		4:00
Total length:					8:00

=== Part 6 ===
Released on March 13, 2019
No.	Title	Lyrics	Music	Artist	Length
1.	"At The End Of Your Left Hand" (왼손끝에)	Lee Jong-soo; Na Byung-soo	Lee Jong-soo; Na Byung-soo	Park Bo-ram	4:08
2.	"At The End Of Your Left Hand" (Inst.)		Lee Jong-soo; Na Byung-soo		4:08
Total length:					8:16

=== Part 7 ===
Released on March 21, 2019
No.	Title	Lyrics	Music	Artist	Length
1.	"Photographs"	Jayins	Jayins	1415	3:40
2.	"Photographs" (Inst.)		Jayins		3:40
Total length:					7:20

=== Part 8 ===
Released on March 28, 2019
No.	Title	Lyrics	Music	Artist	Length
1.	"Falling Down"	Hana (Gugudan)	Ng Kai Ming	Hana (Gugudan)	3:33
2.	"Falling Down" (Inst.)		Ng Kai Ming		3:33
Total length:					7:06

Background tracks

Disc 2:
No.	Title	Artist	Length
1.	"Excellent"	Lee Song Su	2:38
2.	"Curious Magic"	Lee Song Su	2:42
3.	"Wait"	Lee Song Su	1:57
4.	"Life Work"	Lee Song Su	2:26
5.	"Moonlight"	Lee Song Su	4:01
6.	"Afternoon"	Hyun Joong Yoon	2:03
7.	"Starlight"	Hyun Joong Yoon	2:55
8.	"Guy"	Hyun Joong Yoon	2:07
9.	"Joyful"	Hyun Joong Yoon	1:45
10.	"High Heel"	Hyun Joong Yoon	2:12
11.	"Cute Curiosity"	Yang Sung woo	2:14
12.	"Littile Maiden"	Yang Sung woo	2:05
13.	"A life of Beauty"	Yang Sung woo	3:27
14.	"Romantic Feeling"	Yang Sung woo	2:29
15.	"Duck"	Jung Won	1:36
16.	"Amusement Park"	Kyu Chong Won	2:01
17.	"All Crazy"	Kyu Chong Won	2:09
18.	"We are screwed"	Kyu Chong Won	1:56
19.	"New Day"	Kyu Chong Won	3:04
20.	"Caramel Macchiato"	Kim Samuel	2:09
21.	"My Heart goes"	Kim Samuel	1:57
22.	"Elegance Cooking"	Kim Samuel	2:05
23.	"Dancing Shoes"	Kim Samuel	1:58
24.	"Puzzle"	Kim Samuel	2:29
25.	"Do ASAP"	Lee Soo Jin	1:45
26.	"Arabian Night"	Cho Hun Kyung	1:57
27.	"I Like You"	Kim Ho Jang	2:13
28.	"What are you doing?"	Kim Ho Jang	1:57
29.	"Funky Man"	Seo Seong Won	1:34

== Viewership ==
Touch Your Heart : South Korea viewers per episode (thousands)

Season	Episode number																Average
Season	1	2	3	4	5	6	7	8	9	10	11	12	13	14	15	16	Average
1	1249	1119	1027	956	985	965	1163	1083	841	845	888	925	873	771	836	895	964

Source: Audience measurement performed nationwide by Nielsen Korea.

Average TV viewership ratings
Ep.	Original broadcast date	Average audience share (Nielsen Korea)	
Ep.	Original broadcast date	Nationwide	Seoul
1	February 6, 2019	4.736%(1st)	5.154%(1st)
2	February 7, 2019	4.583%(1st)	5.629%(1st)
3	February 13, 2019	4.153%(1st)	4.688%(1st)
4	February 14, 2019	4.670%(1st)	5.236%(1st)
5	February 20, 2019	4.052%(1st)	4.909%(1st)
6	February 21, 2019	3.949%(1st)	4.678%(1st)
7	February 27, 2019	4.386%(1st)	4.802%(1st)
8	February 28, 2019	4.234%(1st)	4.477%(1st)
9	March 6, 2019	3.731%(1st)	4.154%(1st)
10	March 7, 2019	3.904%(1st)	4.256%(1st)
11	March 13, 2019	3.833%(1st)	4.050%(1st)
12	March 14, 2019	3.669%(1st)	4.282%(1st)
13	March 20, 2019	3.745%(1st)	4.055%(1st)
14	March 21, 2019	3.727%(1st)	4.227%(1st)
15	March 27, 2019	3.335%(1st)	3.558%(1st)
16	March 28, 2019	3.803%(1st)	4.576%(1st)
Average		3.969%	4.483%
In the table above, the blue numbers represent the lowest ratings and the red numbers represent the highest ratings.; This series aired on a cable channel/pay TV which normally has a relatively smaller audience compared to free-to-air TV/public broadcasters (KBS, SBS, MBC and EBS).

== Awards and nominations ==
Year	Award	Category	Recipient	Result	Ref.
2019	12th Korea Drama Awards	Excellence Award, Actress	Yoo In-na	Nominated	
2019	27th Korean Culture and Entertainment Awards	Excellence Award, Actor in a Drama	Shim Hyung-tak	Won	
