= Love for a Thousand More =

- Promotional Poster
- Also known as: 1,000th Year Dating; Thousand Years of Love
- Genre: Web series Romance; Fantasy
- Written by: Kwak Kyung-yoon; Na Jae-won; Seo Ji-young
- Directed by: Kim Ki-yoon; Park Bong-sub
- Starring: Kang Seung-yoon; Hwang Seung-eon
- Country of origin: South Korea
- Original language: Korean
- No. of episodes: 10

Production
- Producers: Kim Ki-yoon; Yoon Moo-cheol; Han Sol-bi; Park Sung-kwang
- Production location: South Korea
- Running time: 20 minutes
- Production companies: CJ E&M; YG Entertainment; YGKPlus

Original release
- Network: Naver TV Cast
- Release: December 5 – December 23, 2016

Love for a Thousand More (Korean: 천년째 연애중; Hanja: 千年째 戀愛中; RR: Cheonnyeonjjae yeonaejung) is a South Korean web series starring Kang Seung-yoon and Hwang Seung-eon. The drama aired every Monday, Wednesday and Friday at 11:00 (KST) starting from December 5, 2016 till December 23, 2016 on Naver TV Cast (South Korea), YG Entertainment's YouTube Channel (International) and Miaopai (China).

== Synopsis ==
This is a story about a 1,000-year-old woman named Pyeon Mi-jo (Hwang Seung-eon), who became immortal after she met a certain unidentified man. She offers love counseling services to people based on her experiences over the past 1,000 years, until she finds true love with Yoo Jun-woo (Kang Seung-yoon), who is the leader of the hip-hop crew Krunk Soul.

== Cast ==
=== Main ===
- Kang Seung-yoon as Yoo Jun-woo
  - Kim Jung-chul as young Jun-woo
- Hwang Seung-eon as Pyeon Mi-jo

=== Supporting ===
==== People Around Jun-woo & Mi-jo ====
- Kim Hee-jung as Yeon-ji
- Kim Jin-woo as Hyung-sik
- Jang Ki-yong as Jason

==== Mythomania Group Therapy Members ====
- Kim Yong-hwan as Doctor Lee Dong-hyun
- Bae Jung-nam as a man with breast cancer
- Kim Do-yeon as Fiona
- Kim Young as a NASA Alien Research Team Member

=== Others ===
- Kim Ah-ri as Jun-woo's Mother
- Park Se-jin as a female college student
- Ha Kyung-min as Jang Young-shil
- Lee Seung-joon as Lee Yi
- Kim Jin-ho as Mi-jo's Past Guy 1
- Han Eun-joon as Mi-jo's Past Guy 2
- Yang Dae-sung as Mi-jo's Past Guy 3
- Lee Jong-sung as Mi-jo's Past Guy in Photo
- Yoo Jung-ho as boss of a bingsoo shop
- Kim Min-sung as boss of a fish cake shop
- Yoo Sung-yeol as an employee of a Japanese food shop
- Yoon Joon-ho as a guy at a funeral hall
- Hwang Jae-pil as an engineering student
- Jung Han-sol as a girl that confesses to Jun-woo
- Jo Eun-seo as Counselling Girl 1
- Shim So-young as Counselling Girl 2
- Heo In-beom as Student 1
- Yoo Soo-bin as Student 2
- Gong Byung-joon as a doctor at an emergency room
- Kim Il-suk as Doctor Wang
- Lee Myung-ja as Grandmother
- Kim Tak-ho as Motorcycle Guy
- Choi Ji-young as Mi-jo's Accident Stand-in

=== Cameo ===
- Kal So-won as Counselling Girl 3
- C Jamm as Audition Participant 1
- Pharaoh as Audition Participant 2
- Microdot as Guest Rapper for Krunk Soul

== Original soundtracks ==
Love for a Thousand More Original Soundtrack

Soundtrack album by Kang Seung-yoon
- Released: December 6, 2016
- Genre: Soundtrack
- Language: Korean
- Producer: HIGHGRND

No.	Title	Artist	Length
1.	"You (너)"	Kang Seung-yoon (Winner)	3:35
