= Page (album) =

- Digital cover

Studio album by Kang Seung-yoon
- Released: March 29, 2021
- Length: 42:08
- Language: Korean; English
- Label: YG Entertainment
- Producer: AiRPLAY; Hoyas; Kang Uk-jin; R.Tee; Kang Seung-yoon

Singles from Page
- 1. "Iyah" Released: March 29, 2021

Page is the first studio album by South Korean singer-songwriter Kang Seung-yoon. It was released by YG Entertainment on March 29, 2021. The physical album was released in three versions: the Epilogue version, the Prologue version and the Kit version. The album contains 12 tracks, including the lead single "Iyah". Page has sold 122,202 copies in South Korea as of May 2021.

== Background and promotion ==
On March 18, 2021, YG Entertainment reported that Kang Seung-yoon would be making a comeback on March 29 and confirmed the album title. On March 22, YG revealed the album's track-list. On March 23, the concept teaser of the album was released. The video features Seung-yoon sitting between black and white toned lights, which slowly changed to blue, red and purple, symbolizing the variety of musical colors he will show through the album. On March 29, the sampler for Seung-yoon's new album was released.

On March 29, Seung-yoon held an online media showcase for the release of Page. During the showcase, Seung-yoon described the lead single "Iyah" as a song responsibilities and burdens of becoming an adult as one gets older.

"I’ve put in the things I’ve learned while making music, and living the past 10 years as a ‘person’. The album is like a memoir.

— Yoon described the 12 tracks of Page, YG Entertainment

== Critical reception ==
Professional ratings
Review scores
Source	Rating
IZM	3.5/5 stars

Billboard Vietnam described the album as "carrying the most sincere messages that [Seung-yoon] wants to send to himself as well as to his fans". Writing for online magazine IZM, Hong-hyun Lee praised Seung-yoon for his songwriting and stated "it makes no sense to worry about the talented musician's actions". Lizet Chavez from Vacancy Magazine regarded the album as "raw and vulnerable access to [Yoon's] last ten years in music and on the person those years helped shape today".

== Commercial performance ==
On April 6, 2021, it was reported that the pre-orders of the album has surpassed a total of 100,000 orders, as of April 5. On the chart issued April 2021, Page debuted at number 3 on the South Korean Gaon Album Chart, scoring 122,202 copies of monthly sales.

== Composition ==
Seung-yoon participated in the composing and writing of Page. He explained that Page is about himself and the messages he would like to spread. "Better" (featuring Mino) is a song about regrets and attachment on past relationships. The special track "Iyah" (featuring Yoon Jong-shin) is "formed with a format of Yoon Jong-shin answering to the questions of life Yoon had for the past 10 years". Regarding "Tread on Me", Seung-yoon explained, "I spotted a sprout while walking on the streets. I admired it. While I was trying to take a photo of the sprout in the pavements, a pedestrian stepped on the sprout. That’s when I wrote it on the memo". In a commentary film uploaded by YG Entertainment through their official blog, Yoon explained that the lead single "Iyah" is "a story to myself. It began with the thought, ‘What would I like to tell myself when I’m worn out’".

== Artwork and packaging ==
Seung-yoon released three album versions for Page. The "Prologue" and "Epilogue" versions include a 104-page hardcover photobook, an accordion lyric book, a random photocard, a random polaroid, a random poster, a double-sided poster and a random postcard. The "KiT" version includes a package box, a random Air KiT, a lyric photocard set, a selfie photocard, and masking tape.

== Track listing ==
Page track listing
No.	Title	Lyrics	Music	Arrangement	Length
1.	"Iyah" (아이야; Aiya; lit. Child)	Yoon	AiRPLAY; Yoon	AiRPLAY; Yoon	3:45
2.	"We Need Love" (그냥 사랑 노래; Geunyang sarang norae; lit. Just a Love Song)	Yoon	Diggy; Kang Uk-jin; Yoon	Diggy; Kang Uk-jin	3:15
3.	"Bruise" (멍; Meong; lit. Bruise)	Yoon	Diggy; Kang Uk-jin; Yoon	Diggy; Kang Uk-jin	3:48
4.	"Skip" (featuring Wonstein)	Wonstein; Yoon	Diggy; Hoyas; Kang Uk-jin; Yoon	Diggy; Hoyas; Kang Uk-jin	2:51
5.	"Obvious" (안 봐도; An bwado; lit. Even if I Don't See It) (featuring Simon Dominic)	Simon Dominic; Yoon	R.Tee; Yoon	R.Tee	3:26
6.	"Better" (with Mino)	Mino; Yoon	AiRPLAY; Yoon	AiRPLAY	3:41
7.	"Captain"	Yoon	AiRPLAY; Yoon	AiRPLAY	3:02
8.	"Were We?" (뜨거웠던가요; Ddeugeoweotdeongayo; lit. Was It Hot?)	Yoon	Diggy; Kang Uk-jin; Yoon	Diggy; Kang Uk-jin	3:44
9.	"365"	Yoon	Diggy; Kang Uk-jin; Yoon	Diggy; Kang Uk-jin	4:14
10.	"Tread on Me" (싹; Ssak; lit. Sprout)	Yoon	Diggy; Hoyas; Kang Uk-jin; Yoon	Diggy; Hoyas; Kang Uk-jin	3:18
11.	"Hey Rain" (비야; Biya; lit. Rain)	Yoon	AiRPLAY; Yoon	AiRPLAY; Yoon	3:14
12.	"Iyah" (아이야 (featuring Yoon Jong-shin)	Yoon; Yoon Jong-shin	AiRPLAY; Yoon	AiRPLAY; Yoon	3:45
Total length:					42:08

== Charts ==
=== Weekly charts ===
Weekly chart performance for Page
Chart (2021)	Peak position
South Korean Albums (Gaon)	3

=== Monthly charts ===
Monthly chart performance for Page
Chart (2021)	Peak position
South Korean Album (Gaon)	3

=== Year-end charts ===
Year-end chart performance for Page
Chart (2021)	Position
South Korean Albums (Gaon)	100

== Sales ==
Sales for Page
Region	Certification	Certified units/sales
South Korea	—	122,301

== Release history ==
Release history and formats for Page
Region	Date	Format	Label
Various	March 29, 2021	Download; streaming; CD	YG
Japan	March 29, 2021	digital download; streaming	YGEX
