= Yoga Hakwon =

- Theatrical poster
- Hangul: 요가학원
- Hanja: 요가學院
- RR: Yogahagwon
- MR: Yogahagwŏn
- Directed by: Yoon Jae-yeon
- Produced by: Lee Tae-hoon
- Starring: Eugene; Cha Soo-yeon; Jo Eun-ji; Hwang Seung-eon; Park Han-byul; Lee Young-jin
- Music by: Choi Seung-hyun
- Production company: Opus Pictures
- Distributed by: Sidus FnH
- Release date: 20 August 2009
- Running time: 97 minutes
- Country: South Korea
- Language: Korean

Yoga (a.k.a. Yoga Hakwon, Yoga School, Yoga Academy, Yoga Class, Yoga Institute) is a 2009 South Korean horror film directed by Yoon Jae-yeon.

It is later followed by a stand-alone sequel, The Cursed Lesson, which was released in Nov 18, 2020.

== Plot ==
Hyo-jeong is a co-host of a lingerie show on a shopping channel. However, she loses her job to her younger, more glamorous, rival, and she also gets into a conflict with her boyfriend, Dong-hoon. Deciding to calm herself, Hyo-jeong heeds an old friend, Seon-hwa's advice to take up yoga class for a week. Her yoga colleagues include the jolly but demented In-soon, the failed actress Yeon-joo, the troubled mother Yoo-kyeong, and the quiet Bo-ra. The class is taught by the cryptic instructor Na-ni, who states the following rules: 1. Don't eat, 2. Don't take a shower within an hour after training, 3. Don't talk with the outsider, 4. Don't look into the mirrors and 5. Don't go outside. Na-ni also informs the class that the owner of the yoga school, the former 1970s actress Kan Mi-hee, will join the class on the seventh day.

The five women are suspicious that something is amiss with the school and Na-ni herself. Nevertheless, they continue to undergo intensive training and even start to bicker with each other as they attempt to achieve Kundalini (the "coiled serpent" energy) as promised by Na-ni. Meanwhile, Dong-hoon, who likes to watch Mi-hee's films during her heyday, tries to contact Mi-hee's frequent collaborating director, Kang Hee-joong, only to find him dead with his eye gouged out in his house. Recognizing Seon-Hwa, whom he met just before he discovered Hee-jong's corpse, as Hyo-jeong's friend, he confronts her to ask for Hyo-jeong's whereabouts. Refusing to answer, Seon-Hwa heads down the street only to be hit by an oncoming car. Dong-hoon finally contacts a janitor who formerly worked in Hee-jong's studio, learning that Mi-hee might have something to do with the death of her substitute in her final film after she was fired.

Throughout the week, the women start to break the rules: on the third day, Yoo-kyeong bathes less than an hour after training, and In-soon eats a strangely prepared dinner. Yoo-kyeong is soon found lifeless with slash marks and black goo in the bathroom. Na-ni takes her in to treat her, only for Yoo-kyeong to be choked by Na-ni's pet snake. Later, Bo-ra lends Yeon-joo her mirror, and both of them are dragged by an unseen force on the fifth day. On the sixth day, In-soon catches Hyo-jeong calling Dong-hoon and tries to report it to Na-ni, but she receives her punishment for lawbreaking on the third day: she is revealed to have eaten her pet mouse's corpse which damages her skin, and she is dragged away by a black-clothed woman.

Becoming the only surviving pupil on the seventh day, Hyo-jeong meditates and gets glimpses of Mi-hee. She bolts away to find Mi-hee's corpse with snake-like skin and an eye that produces a snake. Hyo-jeong is knocked out by Na-ni, who then performs a ritual for Mi-hee to take Hyo-jeong's soul. Hyo-jeong, however, manages to escape and discovers her yoga colleagues' dying bodies. As she works to get away from Na-ni, flashbacks reveal that Na-ni is an admirer of Mi-hee and wants to be exactly like her. She says that Mi-hee is a demon who trades Kundalini in exchange for souls. Stating that she cannot continue the act anymore, Na-ni succumbs to her wounds inflicted by Mi-hee while Hyo-jeong escapes.

Hyo-jeong finally makes amends with Dong-hoon. As she heads back home, she encounters her yoga colleagues on the subway, all mysteriously alive. After the subway experiences a brief power failure, Hyo-Jeong shocks in terror when all the people disappear, leaving only posters depicting Mi-hee hanging on the walls.

== Cast ==
- Eugene as Hyo-jeong
- Cha Soo-yeon as Na-ni (yoga master)
- Jo Eun-ji as In-soon
- Park Han-byul as Sung Yeon-joo
- Hwang Seung-eon as Lee Bo-ra
- Kim Hye-na as Yoo-kyeong
- Lee Young-jin as Seon-hwa
- Lee Hye-sang as Kan Mi-hee
- Choi Daniel as Dong-hoon
- Jung In-gi as Kang Hee-joong
- Ban Min-jeong as Eun-jeong

== See also ==
- K-Horror
