= Kang Seung-yoon =

South Korean singer and actor

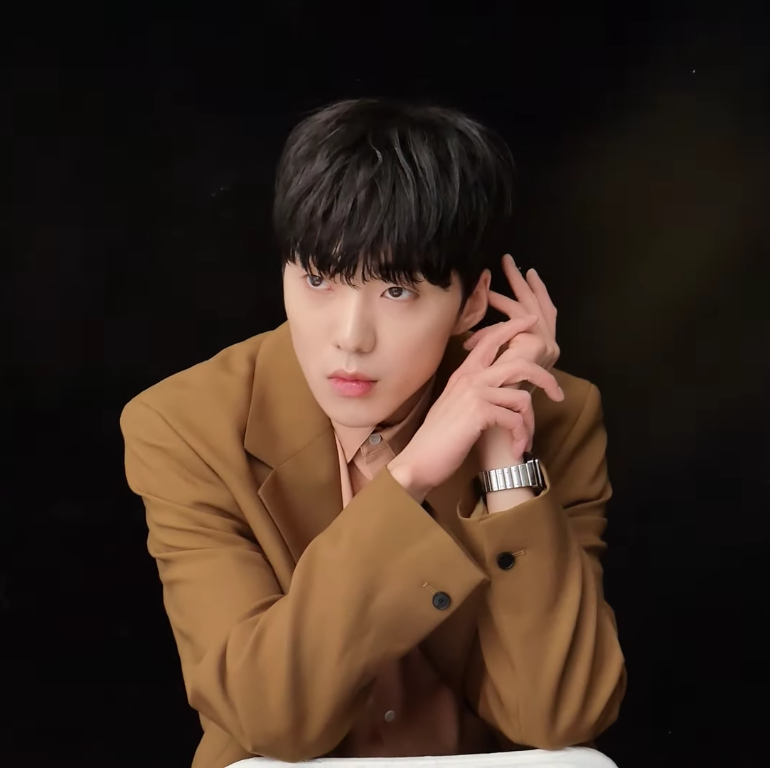
- Kang in 2021
- Born: Kang Seung-yoon; January 21, 1994 (age 32); Haeundae District, Busan, South Korea
- Other name: Yooyeon
- Occupations: Singer; songwriter; composer; actor
- Years active: 2013–present
- Musical career
- Genres: K-pop; hip hop; rock; ballad
- Instruments: Vocals; guitar
- Label: YG
- Member of: Winner; YG Family

Korean name
- Hangul: 강승윤
- Hanja: 姜昇潤
- RR: Gang Seungyun
- MR: Kang Sŭngyun

Kang Seung-yoon (Korean: 강승윤; born January 21, 1994), also known mononymously as Seungyoon or Yoon, is a South Korean singer-songwriter, actor, and leader of boy band Winner. His appearance on the reality television singing contest Superstar K2 (2010) rose him to prominence after finishing in fourth place. The digital single "Instinctively", became his first number-one single as a soloist and neared 2 million digital copies in sales. On January 12, 2011, he signed with South Korean label YG Entertainment and officially debuted as a solo artist on July 16, 2013, with the digital single "It Rains" (비가 온다) and as the leader of Winner on August 17, 2014.

Kang ventured into acting through the sitcom, High Kick: Revenge of the Short Legged (2011). His first lead role with the web series, We Broke Up (2015) earned his first award in the field with "Best Male Actor" awarded by the K-web Fest Awards. His roles in Prison Playbook (2017) and Kairos (2020) further solidified his career as an actor. Kang also served as the "122nd Masked King" on MBC's King of Mask Singer under the alias "Chow Yun-fat". He achieved a record-breaking six consecutive wins, earning him the titles: "The First 6-Time Idol Champion" and "The Youngest Champion" at the time.

== Life and career ==
=== 1994–2009: Early life ===
Kang Seung-yoon was born in Haeundae District, Busan, South Korea, on January 21, 1994, as a Catholic with the baptismal name Don Bosco and as an only child. Raised by his single mother, his parents divorced within the early portion of his childhood and was no longer in contact with his father who chose to depart from their lives until news of his death was relayed long after his death. His mother owned a business but suffered financially from balancing out the accumulated debt. It resulted in her entire profits being allocated towards the debt and so, was in need to borrow more money for additional costs which in turn, resulted in both further liabilities and a bad credit rating and brought more hardship.

In school, he excelled in mathematics with an IQ of 141; however, in his second year of middle school, he became a victim of bullying by those he considered "friends" and dropped out of middle school after he developed social anxiety. In this period of time, he learned to play the classical guitar from an academy and briefly took classes for billiards where he encountered a man 5–6 years older than him who later helped with his anxiety. He then decided to pursue a career as a classical guitarist juxtaposed to his choices as a child which included to delve into politics, become a scientist, a comic book writer or a billiards player – which he became the eventual regional youth representative of and actively played until first year of high school. He took the GED examination for middle school and enrolled at Busan High School of Arts with a major in classic guitar but later considered to be a singer. Kang graduated in 2012.

=== 2010–2013: Commercial success and solo debut ===
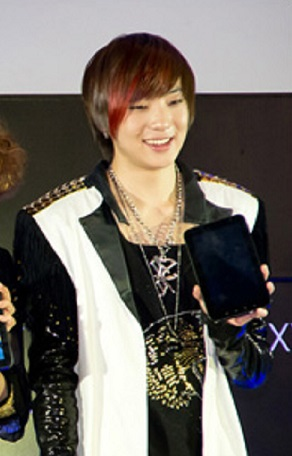
Kang Seungyoon attending the Samsung Galaxy Tab showcase on January 6, 2011

17-year-old Kang (Korean age) attended the regional preliminary audition for Superstar K2 (2010). Initially reluctant due to conflict in perception of using mass media to gain fame opposed to becoming successful without it, he yielded at his friend's request when asked to audition with him, and so, took guitar lessons to further hone his skills three months prior to it. Kang passed the preliminaries with "This Time" by Jonathan Rhys Meyers and overall placed fourth behind Huh Gak, John Park and Jang Jae-in amongst over 1,350,000 applicants. His rendition of "Instinctively" (본능적으로; bonneungjeog-eulo) by Yoon Jong-shin in his last stage received praise by both judges and audience alike. Its digital release led Kang to his first number-one single as a solo artist and neared 2 million digital copies in sales. Its success won him, "Rookie of the Year" at the Gaon Chart Awards and "Rookie of the Month (October)" at the Cyworld Digital Music Awards. CEO Yang Hyun-suk of YG Entertainment and Psy invited Kang to a meeting to propose an offer to join them under a trainee status. Kang signed with them on January 12, 2011, and began training on March 9. He explained: "Since Superstar K2 ended, there were a lot of offers. Some said they would make me a star of Asia, and some offered a great amount of money for a contract. I chose YG Entertainment because this agency evaluated me objectively, unlike others I was viewed as an actual trainee."

In the midst of his trainee period, Kang participated as the fourth artist to release the original soundtrack for Midas (2011). "You Are Heaven" (니가 천국이다; niga cheongug-ida) topped both real-time and daily South Korean music streaming platforms, which include Genie, and peaked at number 11 on the Gaon Digital Chart. That same year, he received an offer to audition for High Kick: Revenge of the Short Legged (2011), which hundreds of individuals lined up for. With no prior experience in acting, Kang auditioned in his Busan dialect and later met with the writers. Although they did not have a place for him amongst the current roles, a new role was specifically curated for him in spurt of the moment. Kang starred alongside Lee Jong-suk and Krystal Jung. In correlation to its soundtrack he collaborated with Lee Juck on "Smile, My Love" (웃어라 그대; useola geudae) which entered the Gaon Digital Chart at number 79. The third installation of the "High Kick" series aired from September 19, 2011, to March 29, 2012.

On June 20, 2013, Yang Hyun-suk announced 19-year-old Kang would debut as a solo artist with the digital single, "Wild and Young", composed by Teddy Park. On July 15, it was revealed to be postponed and instead the next day another digital single in the format of a pre-release entitled "It Rains" (비가 온다; biga onda) was released. The single achieved an "all-kill" which placed number-one on all music streaming platforms in South Korea, including Melon and Mnet, and debuted at number two on the Gaon Digital Chart. His second digital single, "Wild and Young" was released on July 31, with the accompaniment of a music video and appeared on the Gaon Digital Chart at number 18. Live promotions for the single commenced on August 4 from Inkigayo. Kang released his third digital single "Stealer" (맘도둑; mamdodug) ten days later with his second music video which starred rookie actress Yoon Jin-yi. Promotions were not carried out to prevent disruption in promotion of "Wild and Young". "Stealer" debuted at thirteenth on the Gaon Digital Chart.

=== 2014–2019: Debut with Winner and acting projects ===
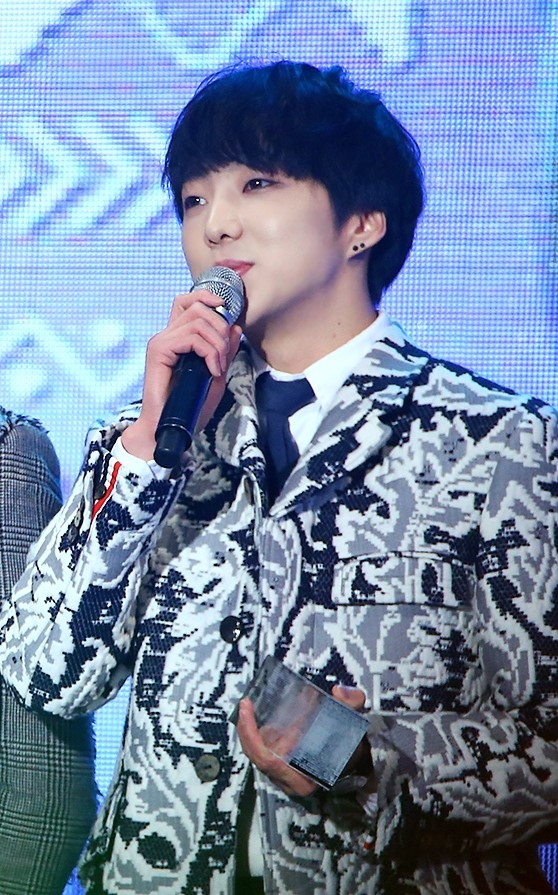
Kang Seungyoon attending the 2014 Melon Music Awards

In the Mnet survival reality broadcast WIN: Who Is Next (2013) Kang participated as a contestant. The program involved two assembles consisting of male trainees under YG Entertainment (A and B) that would compete for the chance to debut by the end of the series after embarking on a 100 day journey. Kang was allocated in "Team A" with Kim Jin-woo, Lee Seung-hoon, Song Min-ho and Nam Tae-hyun in accordance to the label. In the seventh episode of the television broadcast, he temporarily replaced Song as its leader, after he sustained an ankle injury. He became its eventual permanent leader through the appointment of Yang Hyun-suk, ensuing he witnessed growth. On October 25, "Team A" were revealed as victors of the series and would subsequently begin preparations and debut as Winner. Kang made his official debut with the five-piece band, Winner, on August 17, 2014. The band's success upon debut was recorded as "unprecedented" by media outlets, having made their mark in the industry that early on in its career. Kang also participated in Superstar K2 judge panelist Yoon Jong-shin's Monthly project with Song for the digital single, "Wild Boy".

The singer-turned-thespian returned to acting since his last project High Kick: Revenge of the Short Legged (2011), with the web drama We Broke Up (2015). He starred as its male lead with label-mate Sandara Park as his counterpart. The series was aired from June 29, 2015, to July 17 via Naver TV and found success by becoming the fourth most watched web drama on the platform within that year with 11.45 million views and 16 million views collectively as of October 2015. The series were invited to the Geneva International Film Festival in Switzerland, a first amongst all Korean web dramas. Its positive receptions led the main cast to hold a surprise "mini-concert" in Seoul with exclusivity to 200 attendees. His performance in the series accredited to his award for "Best Male Actor" by the K Web Fest Awards. For his second web drama, he starred in Love for a Thousand More (2016) as its male lead and opposite to actress Hwang Seung-eon. The series included band-mate, Kim Jin-woo, and is a joint production of CJ E&M, YG Entertainment, and YG KPlus. While it did not reach the same level of popularity as his prior project, the series exceeded 5 million views as of December 2016 and was cited a success. Kang released a soundtrack for the drama, titled "You" (너; neo) and served as its only release.

In continuation of his acting career, he starred in Prison Playbook (2017–2018). He was cast with a supporting role through an audition in which required him to read a portion from the script using his regional dialect on the spot. Shin Won-ho — the director of the television series — revealed while he initially did not have high expectations as it had been long since he was seen in 'High Kick', he found his portrayal fun and believed he brought the character to life. Shin elaborated: " [...] my generation doesn't really know him as a Winner [member] [...] I didn't have any bias because of the group he was in, he just fit well with us." The series also served as an on-screen reunion for he and Krystal since five years and six months in High Kick: Revenge of the Short Legged (2011–2012). Kang and band-mate Mino released its soundtrack titled "Door" (문; mun). In 2018, he lent his voice for the Korean film Golden Slumber (2018) and its eponymous soundtrack originally by The Beatles. Paul McCartney received $200,000 for its usage, highest for a Korean production.

=== 2020–present: King of Mask Singer and first full-length album ===
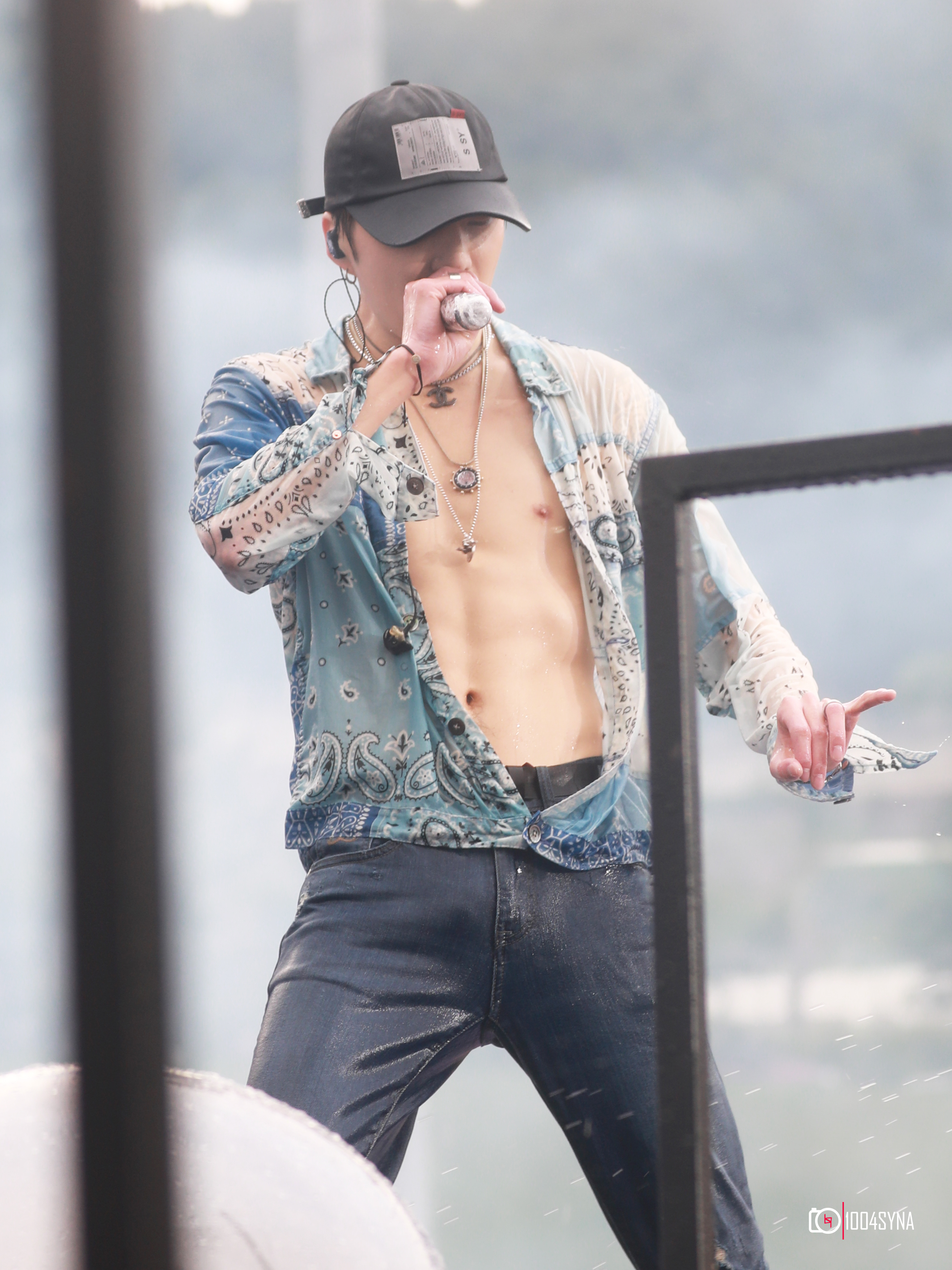
Kang Seungyoon performing at the Waterbomb Festival in Busan on July 13, 2019

In March 2020, Kang was invited by the MBC singing competition program, King of Mask Singer, for the second time and subsequently won, earning the title as the "122nd Mask King" during his appearance as "Chow Yun-fat" after defeating South Korean singer, So Chan-whee. He pulled off six consecutive wins and was named "The First 6-Time Idol Champion" and "The Youngest Champion" at the time. "Chow Yun-fat" was credited for its rise in viewership ratings in which recorded 10% since his first stage. His appearance maintained double digits in rating which placed the show on top within its time slot for five consecutive weeks. Kang's performances placed number-one and two respectively every week on the Naver TV Top 100 Popular Video Chart while his alias topped real-time on search portal site Naver in the entirety of his reign of 14 weeks hence created a buzz.

Kang returned as an actor after three years since Prison Playbook (2017–2018) with Kairos (2020). He joined its main cast as "Im Gun-wook", and was often filmed with Lee Se-young and Lee Joo-myung. His persona earned a nomination at the 2020 MBC Drama Awards for "Best New Actor". He joined the fourth season of Voice (2021), a thriller-procedural series, and acted as "Han Woo-joo", the 4D patrol officer that was specially recruited in the cyber team. In request by the series', he sang the soundtracks "Can You Hear Me" and "Your Voice" for both aforementioned projects.

Kang released his first full-length album on March 29, 2021 — ten years into his career as a musician — entitled Page and its lead single "Iyah" (아이야; aiya). The album debuted at number three on the Gaon Album Chart and sold 122,202 copies in South Korea as of April 2021. The titular amassed 10 million views within the second week of its release on YouTube. In conjunction of it, Kang held his first-ever solo concert titled "Passage" on November 21, 2021. The event were simultaneously held in-person at Olympic Hall in Seoul and online as an integral of "YG Palm Stage 2021" while adhering COVID-19 guidelines and limits. On March 14, 2022, he released his fourth digital single "Born to Love You" and its music video.

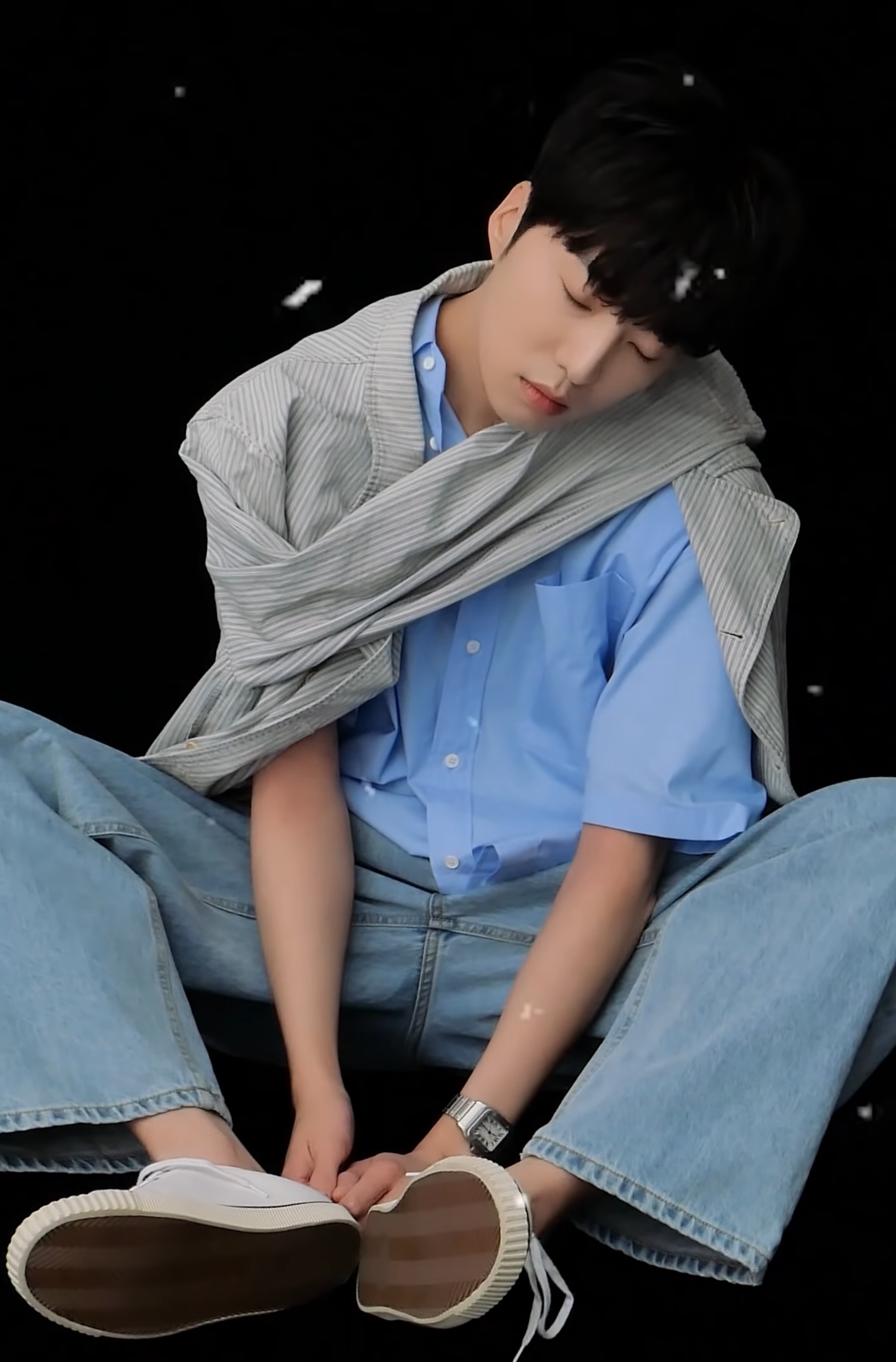
Kang Seungyoon in 2021

Since King of Mask Singer, KBS2 singing competition program, Immortal Songs: Singing the Legend, had sought for Kang to appear on the show; however, he declined their invitations due to his unavailability, until he was requested to compete on the "Lee Juck Special" to which he accepted with Lee personally scouting its participants. Kang performed "Rain" by Lee Juck in its latter half and was crowned the winner against veteran artists Forte di Quattro, Kwak Jin-eon, Choi Jung-in, and Jung Dong-ha. His title as the winner earned him the privilege to compete in the show's "King of Kings Special" and performed "Around 30" (서른 즈음에; seoleun jeueum-e) by Kim Kwang-seok, while competing with a flu against singers Lee Eun-mi and Seodo Band, Lee Young-hyun and Park Min-hye of Big Mama, La Poem and Forestella in its second part of the special. It recorded a rating of 7.7% nationwide and 8.0% in the metropolitan area in July 2022 — ranking first among all entertainment programs on Saturdays and its time slot.

== Personal life ==
=== Health ===
On June 2, 2019, while he carried out promotions with his band for the lead single, "Ah Yeah" (아예; aye), Kang experienced symptoms of a spinal disc herniation while stand-by for rehearsals at Inkigayo. He was transported to the emergency room in a nearby hospital for examination and received treatment for the said diagnosis. He was discharged three days later after completing his treatment and was instructed to rest; however, Kang chose to carry out scheduled activities to minimize any burden inflicted on his band in result of his absence.

=== Military service ===
On May 24, 2023, YG Entertainment announced that Kang will enlist as an active duty soldier. He entered the 5th Division Recruit Training Center on June 20, 2023 and completed his basic military training in July 2023. He was known for being an exemplary trainee in the military, receiving Outstanding Soldier Award in December 2023 and was promoted to a corporal two months early in January 2024. Kang was discharged on December 19, 2024, after completing 18 months of military service.

== Artistry ==
=== Musicality and songwriting ===
"Since I was playing the guitar all the time at the company, Yang Hyun-suk said, 'Kang Seung Yoon, how come whenever you write a song, it's always '7080'? [...] I had the thought that I shouldn't touch the guitar while making music with Winner [...] It's because the direction that Winner is going in is a little different" — Kang Seung-yoon in Knowing Bros

Kang has since been a registered associate member of the Korea Music Copyright Association and was one of twenty-five with band-mate Mino, to be promoted to the status of "full member" in January 2021. The requirements for the promotion include to maintain an associate membership for three years or more, receive a "certain amount" in royalties from copyrighted property each year, and also be selected by the board of directors. They are also given the right to vote at their general meetings.

Kang revealed he was born with weak vocal cords and when not kept in check, he can entirely lose his voice for a whole week. His ENT doctor however, cited he does well in producing sounds with his condition in such that does not hurt nor affect him.

=== Influence ===
In photography, Kang cited Henri Cartier-Bresson as his main inspiration towards the art and so refers to him as the "master of black and white photography", his favorite medium.

== Public image ==
Kang became known and rose to prominence at age 16 after he competed in Superstar K2. He is often identified for his powerful baritone voice and usage of guitar and so he was often dubbed as a "rocker kid".

Within South Korea, Rubin of 1Team stated Kang as his role model and inspiration towards music from the day he viewed his performance of "Black or White" by Michael Jackson on Superstar K2 in the midst of travelling to an academy. Changbin of Stray Kids cited him as an inspiration since his appearance on an audition program and also desired to work on an "emotional hip hop" single with him. South Korean veteran actress, Kim Hee-sun, also cited herself as a fan of both Kang's voice and his band.

== Other ventures ==
=== Endorsements and photography ===
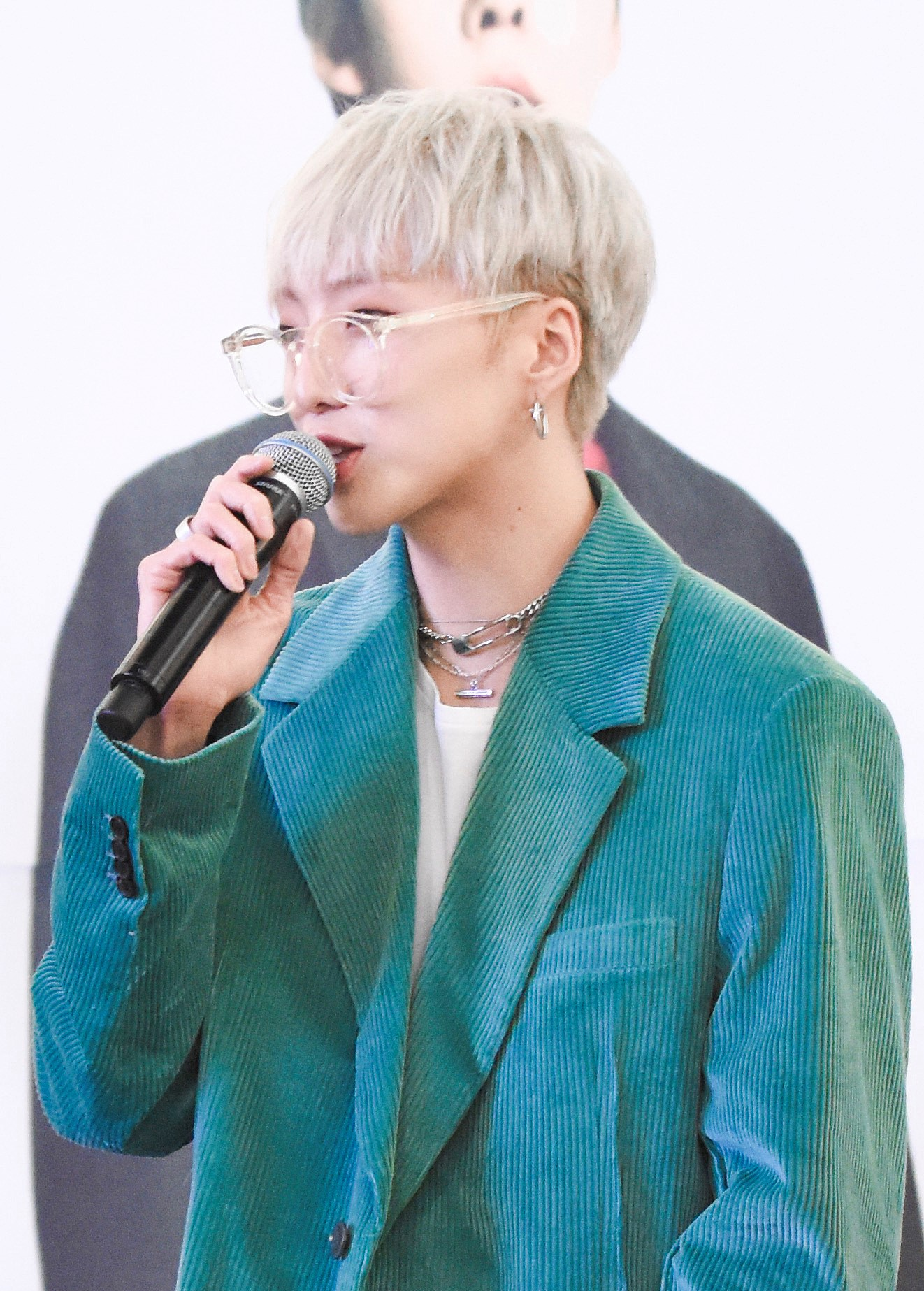
Kang Seungyoon at an album signing event for Winner in 2019

Since 2010, Kang appeared as an endorsement model for LG U+ and its International Call 002 range, CJ Group and the new corporate campaign in six years, "Different ideas that change the world", with Superstar K2 contestants Huh Gak, John Park, Jang Jae-in and YG Family artists Big Bang, 2NE1 and Psy, and also for the Samsung Galaxy Tab. In the years after, he endorsed Grand Chase of KOG Studios, Team Polham of Asian Fashion, Fanta with Lee Kwang-soo and Baek Jin-hee, Yogiyo with label-mates Cha Seung-won, Choi Ji-woo, Yoo In-na AKMU, and J.One Cosmetics.

Under the alias "Yooyeon" — a persona exclusive to photography that translates to "flexible" from Korean in correlation to his mindset — 27-year-old Kang first exhibited his work at the Saatchi Gallery located in West London as part of StART, an international contemporary art fair. He showcased black and white photographs taken amidst various trips.

In March 2023, it was announced that Kang would be holding his first solo photography exhibition, Sky Roof, which would run from March 23 to April 19.

=== Philanthropy ===
In the midst of the "Ice Bucket Challenge" — initiated by senior label-mate Sean of Jinusean within South Korea in 2018 — Sean disclosed in addition to Kang's earlier participation and donation, he quietly donated an extra ₩30 million to the Seungil Hope Foundation.

Following the cancellation of contemporary casual clothing brand PLAC's 'by YOU' collection in collaboration with Seungyoon and bandmate Mino showcase event, scheduled on February 28, 2020, due to safety issues in relation to the recent coronavirus pandemic, the funds they raised towards the showcase was used to donate 10,000 masks for low-income children.

In December 2021, Kang participated in a recording of an audio guide for an exhibition at the Korea National Maritime Museum in Busan entitled "Wonderworld Maps: Connecting Longingness Beyond the Horizon." It was created to help individuals with vision impairment enjoy the exhibition while listening to the explanations of each piece. Kang donated the entire earning he received from recording the audio guide to fund the education of children whose families are part of the Siloam Center for the Blind.

On August 11, 2022, Kang donated ₩50 million to help those affected by the 2022 South Korean floods through the Hope Bridge Korea Disaster Relief Association.

== Ambassadorship ==
Year	Title	Appointed by	Ref.
2010	Dispatch! Marvel Cops Ambassador	CJ Internet, the National Police Agency and YMCA	

== Discography ==
=== Studio albums ===
List of studio albums, with selected details, chart positions, and sales
Title	Details	Peak positions	Sales
Title	Details	KOR	Sales
Page	Released: March 29, 2021; Label: YG Entertainment; Formats: CD, digital download	3	KOR: 123,793
Page 2	Released: November 3, 2025; Label: YG Entertainment; Formats: CD, digital download	12	KOR: 33,900

=== Singles ===
Title	Year	Peak position		Sales	Album
Title	Year	KOR Gaon	KOR Hot (Note: The Korea K-Pop Hot 100 was launched in September 2011 by Billboard and was discontinued in 2014. The chart was later brought back in May 2017.)	Sales	Album
"Instinctively" (본능적으로)	2010	1	*	KOR: 1,992,026	Superstar K2: Up to 11
"It Rains" (비가 온다)	2013	1	4	KOR: 646,766	Non-album singles
"Wild and Young"	2013	18	23	KOR: 126,500	Non-album singles
"Stealer" (맘도둑)	2013	9	13	KOR: 229,988	Non-album singles
"Iyah" (아이야)	2021	105	—	—N/a	Page
"Born to Love You"	2022	129	—	—N/a	Non-album single
"Me"	2025	—	—	—N/a	Page 2
"—" denotes releases that did not chart or were not released in that region. "*" denotes the chart did not exist at that time.

=== Promotional singles ===
Title	Year	Note	Ref.
"Life Is Tab"	2011	Collaboration with Samsung Galaxy Tab	
"Have You Ever Fallen in Love"	2011	Collaboration with Standing Egg and Polham	

=== Collaborations ===
Title	Year	Peak positions	Sales	Album
Title	Year	KOR	Sales	Album
"Wild Boy" (with Yoon Jong-shin and Mino)	2014	25	KOR: 67,675	Yoon Jong Shin Monthly — March 2014

=== Other charted songs ===
Title	Year	Peak positions	Sales	Album
Title	Year	KOR	Sales	Album
"I'll Write You a Letter" (당신께 쓰는 편지)	2010	24	—N/a	Superstar K2: Top 6 (My Story)

=== Soundtrack appearances ===
Title	Year	Peak positions	Sales	Album
Title	Year	KOR	Sales	Album
"You Are Heaven" (니가 천국이다)	2011	11	KOR: 315,311	Midas OST
"Smile, My Love" (웃어라 그대) (with Lee Juck)	2012	79	KOR: 58,394	High Kick 3 OST
"You" (너)	2016	89	KOR: 20,684	Love for a Thousand More OST
"Door" (문) (with Mino)	2017	— (Note: "The Door" did not enter the Gaon Digital Chart, but peaked and debuted at number 79 on the Gaon Download Chart.)	KOR: 18,521	Prison Playbook OST
"Golden Slumbers"	2018	—	—N/a	Golden Slumber OST
"Can You Hear Me"	2020	— (Note: "Can You Hear Me" did not enter the Gaon Digital Chart, but peaked and debuted at number 186 on the Gaon Download Chart.)	—N/a	Kairos OST
"Your Voice"	2021	— (Note: "Your Voice" did not enter the Gaon Digital Chart, but peaked and debuted at number 96 on the Gaon Download Chart.)	—N/a	Voice 4 OST
"Gulliver"	2022	— (Note: "Gulliver" did not enter the Circle Digital Chart, but peaked and debuted at number 92 on the Circle Download Chart.)	—N/a	Street Man Fighter OST
"No Breaks" (직진)	2026	— (Note: "No Breaks" did not enter the Circle Digital Chart, but peaked and debuted at number 196 on the Circle Download Chart.)	—N/a	Reborn Rookie OST
"—" denotes items which were not released in that country or failed to chart.

=== Production credits ===
All song credits are adapted from the Korea Music Copyright Association's database, unless otherwise noted.

==== Solo work ====
List of songs, showing year released, and name of the album
Year	Song	Album	Lyricist		Composer	
Year	Song	Album	Credited	With	Credited	With
2010	"I'll Write You a Letter"	Superstar K 2: Top 6 (My Story)	Yes	–	No	–
2015	"0+1"	We Broke Up OST	Yes	–	No	–
2015	"Two of Us"	We Broke Up OST	Yes	–	No	–
2015	"Today"	We Broke Up OST	Yes	–	No	–
2015	"We Broke Up"	We Broke Up OST	Yes	–	No	–
2019	"Wind" (바람)	Cross	Yes	–	Yes	Kang Uk Jin, Diggy, Hoyas
2021	"Iyah" (아이야)	Page	Yes	–	Yes	Airplay
2021	"We Need Love" (그냥 사랑 노래)	Page	Yes	–	Yes	Diggy, Kang Uk Jin
2021	"Bruise" (멍)	Page	Yes	–	Yes	Diggy, Kang Uk Jin
2021	"Skip"	Page	Yes	Wonstein	Yes	Hoyas, Diggy, Kang Uk Jin
2021	"Obvious" (안 봐도)	Page	Yes	Simon Dominic	Yes	R. Tee
2021	"Better"	Page	Yes	Mino	Yes	Airplay
2021	"Captain"	Page	Yes	–	Yes	Airplay
2021	"Were We" (뜨거웠던가요)	Page	Yes	–	Yes	Kang Uk Jin, Diggy
2021	"365"	Page	Yes	–	Yes	Kang Uk Jin, Diggy
2021	"Tread On Me" (싹)	Page	Yes	–	Yes	Kang Uk Jin, Diggy, Hoyas
2021	"Hey Rain" (비야)	Page	Yes	–	Yes	Airplay
2021	"Iyah" (아이야)	Page	Yes	Yoon Jong-shin	Yes	Airplay

==== Work as Winner ====
List of songs, showing year released, and name of the album
Year	Song	Album	Lyricist		Composer	
Year	Song	Album	Credited	With	Credited	With
2013	"Go Up"	WIN: Who Is Next (Final Battle)	Yes	Mino, Seunghoon	Yes	–
2013	"Just Another Boy"	WIN: Who Is Next (Final Battle)	No	–	Yes	Teddy, Mino, Taehyun
2014	"Color Ring" (컬러링)	2014 S/S	Yes	Mino, Seunghoon	Yes	Ham Seung Chun, Kang Uk Jin, iHwak, Dee.P
2014	"Love Is a Lie" (척)	2014 S/S	No	–	Yes	Mino, The Fliptones
2014	"Different"	2014 S/S	Yes	Mino, Seunghoon	Yes	Mino
2014	"Smile Again"	2014 S/S	Yes	Mino, Seunghoon	Yes	Mino, Dee.P
2016	"Immature"	Exit : E	Yes	Mino, Seunghoon	Yes	Kang Uk Jin
2017	"Really Really"	Fate Number For	Yes	Mino, Seunghoon	Yes	Kang Uk Jin, Mino
2017	"Fool"	Fate Number For	Yes	–	Yes	Airplay
2017	"Love Me Love Me"	Our Twenty For	Yes	Mino, Seunghoon	Yes	Future Bounce, Mino
2017	"Island"	Our Twenty For	Yes	Mino, Seunghoon, Bekuh Boom	Yes	Future Bounce, Bekuh Boom
2018	"Everyday"	EVERYD4Y	Yes	Mino, Seunghoon	Yes	Airplay, Mino
2018	"Air"	EVERYD4Y	Yes	Mino, Seunghoon	Yes	Airplay
2018	"La La"	EVERYD4Y	Yes	Mino, Seunghoon	Yes	Kang Uk Jin
2018	"For" (애 걔)	EVERYD4Y	Yes	Mino, Seunghoon	Yes	Kang Uk Jin, Diggy, Mino
2018	"We Were" (예뻤더라)	EVERYD4Y	Yes	–	Yes	Airplay
2018	"Luxury" (사치)	EVERYD4Y	Yes	Mino, Seunghoon	Yes	Kang Uk Jin, Diggy
2018	"Movie Star"	EVERYD4Y	Yes	Mino, Seunghoon	Yes	Airplay
2018	"Special Night"	EVERYD4Y	No	–	Yes	Seunghoon, Airplay
2018	"Have a Good Day"	EVERYD4Y	No	–	Yes	Mino, Kang Uk Jin
2018	"Millions"	Millions	Yes	Mino, Seunghoon	Yes	Kang Uk Jin, Diggy
2019	"Ah Yeah" (아예)	We	Yes	Mino, Seunghoon	Yes	Kang Uk Jin, Diggy, Joe Rhee
2019	"Mola" (몰라도너무몰라)	We	No	–	Yes	Kang Uk Jin, Diggy
2019	"Boom"	We	Yes	Mino, Seunghoon	Yes	Airplay
2019	"Everyday" (remix)	We	Yes	Mino, Seunghoon	Yes	Airplay, Mino
2019	"Soso"	Cross	Yes	Mino, Seunghoon	Yes	Airplay
2019	"OMG"	Cross	Yes	Mino, Seunghoon	Yes	Airplay
2019	"Dress Up" (빼입어)	Cross	Yes	Mino, Seunghoon	No	–
2020	"Dduk" (뚝)	Remember	Yes	–	Yes	Airplay
2020	"Just Dance" (막춤)	Remember	Yes	Mino, Seunghoon	Yes	Kang Uk Jin, Diggy
2020	"Teaser"	Remember	Yes	Mino, Seunghoon	Yes	Kang Uk Jin, Diggy
2020	"Well"	Remember	Yes	Mino, Seunghoon	Yes	Kang Uk Jin, Diggy
2022	"I Love U"	Holiday	Yes	Mino, Lee Chan-hyuk, Airplay, Kid Wine, Bang Ye-dam	Yes	Dee.P, Lee Chan-hyuk, Aftrshok, Rajan Muse, Noerio, Brian U, Bang Ye-dam
2022	"10 Min" (10분)	Holiday	Yes	Mino, Seunghoon	Yes	Airplay
2022	"Holiday"	Holiday	Yes	Mino, Seunghoon	Yes	Kang Uk Jin, Diggy
2022	"Sweet Home" (집으로)	Holiday	Yes	Mino, Seunghoon	Yes	Kang Uk Jin, Diggy
2022	"Family"	Holiday	Yes	Mino, Seunghoon, Ahn Young Joo, Y0ung	Yes	P.K, Aftrshok, Rich Chordz, JoKing, Dixie Normous, DJ Ain
2022	"Little Finger" (새끼손가락)	Holiday	Yes	Mino, Seunghoon	Yes	Mino, Airplay

==== Other artists ====
List of songs, showing year released, and name of the album
Year	Artist	Song	Album	Lyricist		Composer	
Year	Artist	Song	Album	Credited	With	Credited	With
2020	Kim Jin-woo	"Dduk" (뚝)	Remember	Yes	–	Yes	Airplay
2020	Bang Ye-dam	"Wayo" (왜요)	Non-album single	Yes	Lee Chan-hyuk, Future Bounce	Yes	Future Bounce, Andrew Choi
2022	iKon	"Gold" (금)	Flashback	Yes	Bobby	Yes	Diggy, Kang Uk Jin

== Videography ==
=== Music videos ===
Year	Title	Artist	Director(s)	Length	Ref.
2013	"Wild and Young"	Kang Seung-yoon	Han Sa-min	3:52	
2013	"Stealer" (맘도둑)	Kang Seung-yoon	—N/a	3:48	
2021	"Iyah" (아이야)	Kang Seung-yoon	Kwon Yong-soo	4:15	
2022	"Born to Love You"	Kang Seung-yoon	—N/a	3:00	

== Filmography ==
=== Television series ===
Year	Title		Role	Notes	Ref.
Year	English	Korean	Role	Notes	Ref.
2011–2012	High Kick: Revenge of the Short Legged	우하이킥! : 짧은 다리의 역습	Kang Seung-yoon		
2015	The Producers	프로듀사	Kang Seung-yoon	Cameo (Episodes 4–5, 10 and 12)	
2017–2018	Prison Playbook	슬기로운 감빵생활	Lee Joo-hyung		
2020	Kairos	카이로스	Im Gun-wook		
2021	Voice	보이스	Han Woo-ju	Season 4	
2021	Racket Boys	라켓소년단	Kang Tae-seon	Cameo (Episodes 12–16)	
2022	Tomorrow	내일	Kang Woo-jin	Cameo (Episodes 4–5)	
2022	Drama Special – Underwear Season	드라마스페셜 – 팬티의 계절	Ban Sang-soo	One act-drama	
2023	Heart Signal	하트시그널	Panelist	Season 4	

=== Web series ===
Year	Title		Role	Ref.
Year	English	Korean	Role	Ref.
2015	We Broke Up	우리 헤어졌어요	Ji Won-young	
2016	Love for a Thousand More	천년째 연애중	Yoo Jun-woo	

=== Television shows ===
Year	Title		Role	Notes	Ref.
Year	English	Korean	Role	Notes	Ref.
2010	Superstar K2	슈퍼스타K 2	Contestant	Placed 4th overall	
2013	WIN: Who Is Next?	윈:후 이즈 넥스트	Contestant	Team A member	
2016	The Collaboration	더 콜라보레이션	Contestant	Episodes 1–5	
2016	Flower Crew	꽃놀이패	Regular cast	Episodes 13–29	
2017	King of Mask Singer	복면가왕	Contestant	Episode 109	
2019	Chart Rewriting Show: Number 1	다시쓰는 차트쇼 지금 1위는	Contestant	Season 2 Episodes 3-4	
2019	Vocal Play 2	보컬플레이2	Judge	—N/a	
2020	King of Mask Singer	복면가왕	Contestant	Episodes 243–256	
2020	K-pop Idol Lyric Guide	K-POP 가사도우미	Host	with Kim Tae-won	
2021	New Singer	새가수	Judge	—N/a	
2021	Sinabro Dream Operator	시나브로 꿈 조작단	Regular cast	with Lee Yong-jin and Yoo In-na	
2022	All Table Tennis!	올 탁구나!	Regular cast	Team Podang Podang	
2022	Youth Star	청춘스타	Mentor / Judge	—N/a	
2022	Immortal Songs: Singing the Legend	불후의 명곡: 전설을 노래하다	Contestant	Episodes 560–561, 564–565, 597–598	
2022	Street Man Fighter: Gala Talkshow	스트릿 맨 파이터 갈라 토크쇼	Host	with Haha and Jang Do-yeon	
2022	Korea After School: Field Trip	수학여행	Host	Season 1	
2023	Hell Court	이상한 나라의 지옥법정	Regular cast	—N/a	
2023	Differential Class	차이나는 클라스	Regular cast	—N/a	
2023	Fantasy Boys	소년판타지	Mentor / Producer	with Wooyoung, Jinyoung, and Jeon So-yeon	

=== Web shows ===
Year	Title		Role	Notes	Ref.
Year	English	Korean	Role	Notes	Ref.
2021	Kang Seung Yoon [The Prequel]	강승윤 더 프리퀄	Himself	Reality-documentary; YouTube series	
2022	Saturday Night Live Korea	SNL 코리아2	Host	Season 2 – Episode 12	
2022	Some-fing	썸핑	Host	with Kim Jinwoo, Jo Seho, Mijoo and Uhm Jiyoon	
2022	Sali & Yoonie: Jingle Guys	사리와 유니: 징글징글한 녀석들	Host	with Nucksal	

=== Radio shows ===
Year	Title		Role	Notes	Ref.
Year	English	Korean	Role	Notes	Ref.
2022	Noon's Hope Song, Kim Shin-young	정오의 희망곡 김신영입니다	Special DJ	August 2	

== Concerts and tours ==
=== Concerts ===
Date	Title	City	Country	Venue	Ref.
November 21, 2021	YG Palm Stage — 2021 Yoon: Passage	Seoul	South Korea	Olympic Hall	
December 24, 2025	Passage #2	Busan	South Korea		
December 25, 2025	Passage #2	Busan	South Korea		
January 3, 2026	Passage #2	Daegu	South Korea		
January 17, 2026	Passage #2	Gwangju	South Korea		
February 28, 2026	Passage #2	Seoul	South Korea		
March 1, 2026	Passage #2	Seoul	South Korea		
March 14, 2026	Passage #2	Osaka	Japan		
March 15, 2026	Passage #2	Tokyo	Japan		

== Awards and nominations ==
Name of the award ceremony, year presented, award category, nominee(s) of the award, and the result of the nomination
Award ceremony	Year	Category	Nominee(s)/work(s)	Result	Ref.
Brand of the Year Awards	2022	Best Male Idol Entertainer	Kang Seung-yoon	Nominated	
Cyworld Digital Music Awards	2010	Rookie of the Month – October	Kang Seung-yoon	Won	
Gaon Chart Music Awards	2011	Rookie of the Year	Kang Seung-yoon	Won	
Gaon Chart Music Awards	2022	Mubeat Global Choice Award – Male	Kang Seung-yoon	Nominated	
K Web Fest Awards	2015	Best Male Actor	We Broke Up	Won	
KBS Drama Awards	2022	Best Actor in Drama Special / TV Cinema	Underwear Season	Nominated	
MBC Drama Awards	2020	Best New Actor	Kairos	Nominated	
MelOn Music Awards	2013	Best Rock	"It Rains" (비가 온다)	Nominated	
Mnet 20's Choice Awards	2012	Upcoming 20's	Kang Seung-yoon	Nominated	
Seoul International Drama Awards	2021	Outstanding Korean Drama OST	"Can You Hear Me"	Nominated	
Seoul Music Awards	2014	Rookie Award	Kang Seung-yoon	Nominated	
Seoul Music Awards	2025	OST Award	"She Woke Me Up"	Nominated	
