= Come and Hug Me =

2018 South Korean television series

- Promotional poster
- Also known as: Come Here and Give Me a Hug
- Hangul: 이리와 안아줘
- RR: Iriwa anajwo
- MR: Iriwa anajwŏ
- Genre: Romance; Melodrama; Thriller; Mystery
- Created by: Park Seong-eun
- Written by: Lee A-ram
- Directed by: Choi Joon-bae
- Starring: Jang Ki-yong; Jin Ki-joo; Huh Joon-ho
- Country of origin: South Korea
- Original language: Korean
- No. of episodes: 32 (Note: In order to circumvent Korean laws that prevent commercial breaks in the middle of an episode, what would previously have been aired as single 70 minute episodes are now being repackaged as two 35 minute episodes, with two episodes being shown each night with a commercial break between the two.)

Production
- Executive producers: Park Tae-young; Pyo Min-soo; Sim Jae-hyun; Yoo Jin
- Camera setup: Single-camera
- Running time: 35 minutes
- Production companies: Company Ching; Imagine Asia

Original release
- Network: MBC TV
- Release: May 16 – July 19, 2018

Come and Hug Me (Korean: 이리와 안아줘; RR: Iriwa anajwo) is a 2018 South Korean television series starring Jang Ki-yong, Jin Ki-joo and Huh Joon-ho. It aired on MBC from May 16 to July 19, 2018.

== Synopsis ==
A man and a woman who were each other's first loves during childhood reunite years later as adults.

In his childhood, Yoon Na-moo was a seemingly quiet and mysterious boy whose father was a psychopath serial killer. He meets his polar opposite in Gil Nak-won, a daughter of a popular actress. Through Nak-won's persistence and pure and loving nature towards Na-moo, Na-moo falls into a reciprocated love. But when Na-moo's father, Yoon Hee-jae — a man with a twisted affection for his son — murders Nak-won's parents, their short love comes to an end.

Years later, Gil Nak-won is now Han Jae-yi, an aspiring actress (like her mother) who always tries to have a good outlook on life, but who also has a panic disorder due to her traumatic past. Yoon Na-moo is now Chae Do-jin, a rookie detective who wishes to atone for his father's sins. These two would-be lovers have held on to the precious memories of when they were together, but, connected by a tragic fate, they must try to overcome the stigma and hardships they will later face.

== Cast ==
=== Main ===
- Jang Ki-yong as Chae Do-jin
  - Nam Da-reum as young Chae Do-jin / Yoon Na-moo
  - Moon Woo-jin as child Chae Do-jin

A rookie detective who graduated from police university at the top of his class. He has never forgotten his first and only love, Nak-won, for whom he felt guilty since his father killed her parents. He later becomes Jae-yi's boyfriend.

- Jin Ki-joo as Han Jae-yi
  - Ryu Han-bi as young Han Jae-yi / Gil Nak-won

A woman with a post-traumatic stress disorder who dreams of becoming an actress like her mother. Though she has suffered greatly, she overcomes it and vows to live well. She never blames Do-jin despite him being the son of her parents' killer. She eventually becomes Do-jin's girlfriend.

- Huh Joon-ho as Yoon Hee-jae

Chae Do-jin's father. A psychopathic serial killer who displays a twisted affection for his son and shows no remorse. He murders Jae-yi's parents and countless other people. After Do-jin calls the police, he is arrested and sentenced to death after the court finds him guilty of twelve murders. He later escapes from prison and commits a few more crimes (including two murders), and tries to mould Do-jin into a killer by kidnapping and killing Jae-yi. However, he fails, and Do-jin arrests him.

=== Recurring ===
- Yoon Jong-hoon as Gil Moo-won / Lim Tae-kyung
  - Jung Yoo-ahn as young Gil Moo-won / Lim Tae-kyung

A prosecutor and Han Jae-yi's adopted brother who cares for his sister. He is wary and distrusting of Chae Do-jin, since Do-jin is the son of his foster parents' killer. It is later revealed that he is the murderer of his parents' killer, but he is acquitted due to his extremely young age, and because it was a killing done out of self-defence. He eventually trusts Do-jin, and in the final episode, he approves of his sister's relationship with Do-jin.

- Kim Kyung-nam as Yoon Hyun-moo
  - Kim Sang-woo as young Yoon Hyun-moo

Chae Do-jin's elder brother. He has a violent personality and tries to follow his psychopathic father's footsteps. He feels jealous towards Do-jin for being his father's favourite child, which is compounded by the hatred he feels against Do-jin for reporting their father to the police.

- Kwon Hyuk-soo as Kim Jong-hyun

Chae Do-jin's close friend, and fellow cadet at the police academy.

- Seo Jeong-yeon as Chae Ok-hee

Chae Do-jin's stepmother. She is Hee-jae's wife from a fourth marriage, and she treats Do-jin as her own child. She repeatedly tries to open up to Hyun-moo and accept him, but Hyun-moo rejects her kindness, until much later in the series when Hyun-moo finally opens up to her.

- Choi Ri as Chae Seo-jin
  - Lee Ye-won as young Chae So-jin

Chae Do-jin's younger stepsister. She is the daughter of Ok-hee and another man (prior to her marriage to Hee-jae), but she still regards Do-jin and Hyun-moo as her brothers despite having no blood relations to them.

- Lee Da-in as Lee Yeon-ji

The sole female police detective of Do-jin's unit, and Do-jin's former classmate in the police academy. She sympathises with Do-jin and befriends him despite knowing his father's identity.

- Joo Woo-jae as Kang Yoon-sung

An actor who is the co-star of Jae-yi's drama.

- Jung In-gi as Go Yi-seok

A police detective who investigates Hee-jae's case and a mentor of Do-jin in the police force. He treats Do-jin with care and kindness, and loves Ok-hee but never confesses to her. He is later killed by Hee-jae when the latter escapes from prison.

- Min Sung-wook as Kang Nam-gil

A senior police detective of Do-jin's team.

- Kim Seo-hyung as Park Hee-young

An unscrupulous reporter who often makes news reports about Hee-jae's case, and harasses both Do-jin and Jae-yi for the sake of getting more exclusive news reports related to Hee-jae as an advancement of her reporting career. She is murdered by Ji-hong, who is earlier released from prison.

- Yoon Ji-hye as Han Ji-ho

A female reporter who is Hee-young's rival. She also tries to get a scoop regarding the Yoon Hee-jae serial murders by approaching Do-jin and Jae-yi. Unlike Hee-young, she is more morally equipped and realises to an extent the negative impact the reports about Hee-jae's case have on Do-jin and Jae-yi.

- Park Soo-young as Pyo-taek

An obese yet jovial and kind man who is Jae-yi's manager, and who cares about Jae-yi's welfare.

- Jung Da-hye as Cheon Se-kyung

A famous actress who is Hye-won's junior prior to Hye-won's murder. She may look unfriendly and cold, but she is actually warm-hearted and caring to people around her, especially to Jae-yi whom she sympathises for her trauma of losing her parents.

- Park Kyung-choo as Gil Sung-sik

Han Jae-yi and Gil Moo-won's father. He is a lawyer who is murdered by Hee-jae.

- Park Joo-mi as Ji Hye-won

Han Jae-yi and Gil Moo-won's mother. She is an actress who is murdered by Hee-jae for treating his son well.

- Hong Seung-bum as Lee Seung-woo / Yeom Ji-hong

An ex-convict who idolizes Hee-jae after meeting him in prison, and seeks to become a serial killer like him. After his release from jail, Ji-hong kills Hee-young as revenge for Hee-jae, and even assaults several people in different secluded places.

- Bae Hae-sun as Jeon Yoo-ra

Hee-jae's accomplice, who helps him commit the serial murders.

- Kim Hye-yoon as Yun-sil
- Kim Ji-eun as Moo-won's office investigator
- Chae Jong-hyeop as Jung Eui-ah

=== Special appearances ===
- Song Young-kyu as Professor (ep 1)
- Jang Gwang (ep 1)

== Production ==
- Nam Joo-hyuk and Bae Suzy were offered to play the lead roles, but both declined.
- The first script reading was held between late March and early April at MBC Broadcasting Station in Sangam, South Korea.

== Original soundtrack ==
Come and Hug Me OST

Soundtrack album by Various artists
- Released: 2018
- Genre: Soundtrack
- Languages: Korean, English
- Labels: Blending Co., Ltd.

=== Part 1 ===
Released on May 31, 2018
No.	Title	Lyrics	Music	Artist	Length
1.	"Crying Silently" (소리 없이 운다)	Kim Chang-rak, Kim Soo-bin	Kim Chang-rak, Kim Soo-bin, Jo Se-hee	Yang Yo-seob (Highlight)	03:40
2.	"Crying Silently (Inst.)" (소리 없이 운다 (Inst.))		Kim Chang-rak, Kim Soo-bin, Jo Se-hee		03:40
Total length:					07:20

=== Part 2 ===
Released on June 6, 2018
No.	Title	Lyrics	Music	Artist	Length
1.	"Don't Disappear" (사라지지 마)	Kim Gi-bin, March	Kim Judy, Red Haired Anne	Yujeong, Soyeon (Laboum)	04:21
2.	"Don't Disappear (Inst.)" (사라지지 마 (Inst.))		Kim Judy, Red Haired Anne		04:21
Total length:					08:42

=== Part 3 ===
Released on June 20, 2018
No.	Title	Lyrics	Music	Artist	Length
1.	"Times Without You" (너 없는 시간)	Kim Bum-joo, Kevin	Kim Bum-joo	Na Yoon-kwon	03:55
2.	"Times Without You (Inst.)" (너 없는 시간 (Inst.))		Kim Bum-joo		03:55
Total length:					07:50

=== Part 4 ===
Released on June 28, 2018
No.	Title	Lyrics	Music	Artist	Length
1.	"Yesterday"	Kim Soo-bin	Kim Chang-rak, Kim Soo-bin, Jo Se-hee	Vincent	03:30
2.	"Yesterday (Inst.)"		Kim Chang-rak, Kim Soo-bin, Jo Se-hee		03:30
Total length:					07:00

=== Part 5 ===
Released on July 11, 2018
No.	Title	Lyrics	Music	Artist	Length
1.	"Desperately Wanted" (간절히 원하면)	Jo Eun-hee	Phenomenotes	Ahn Hyun-jeong	03:25
2.	"Desperately Wanted (Inst.)" (간절히 원하면 (Inst.))		Phenomenotes		03:25
Total length:					06:50

=== Part 6 ===
Released on July 18, 2018
No.	Title	Lyrics	Music	Artist	Length
1.	"I Promise You"	Kim Chang-rak, Kim Soo-bin, Jo Se-hee	Kim Chang-rak, Kim Soo-bin, Jo Se-hee	Park Da-bin	03:45
2.	"I Promise You (Inst.)"		Kim Chang-rak, Kim Soo-bin, Jo Se-hee		03:45
Total length:					07:30

== Ratings ==
- In the table below, the blue numbers represent the lowest ratings and the red numbers represent the highest ratings.
- NR denotes that the drama did not rank in the top 20 daily programs on that date.
- TNmS stop publishing their report from June 2018.

Ep.	Original broadcast date	Average audience share			
Ep.	Original broadcast date	TNmS		AGB Nielsen	
Ep.	Original broadcast date	Nationwide	Seoul	Nationwide	Seoul
1	May 16, 2018	4.0% (NR)	4.2%	3.1% (NR)	3.3% (NR)
2	May 16, 2018	4.9% (NR)	5.0%	3.9% (NR)	4.1% (NR)
3	May 17, 2018	4.2% (NR)	4.4%	3.8% (NR)	4.0% (NR)
4	May 17, 2018	5.0% (NR)	5.2%	4.4% (NR)	4.6% (NR)
5	May 23, 2018	4.8% (NR)	5.0%	4.2% (NR)	4.4% (NR)
6	May 23, 2018	5.2% (NR)	5.4%	4.7% (NR)	4.9% (NR)
7	May 24, 2018	5.3% (NR)	5.5%	4.6% (NR)	4.8% (NR)
8	May 24, 2018	6.3% (20th)	6.8%	5.4% (16th)	5.9% (13th)
9	May 30, 2018	5.9% (NR)	6.1%	4.3% (NR)	4.5% (NR)
10	May 30, 2018	6.5% (17th)	7.4%	5.1% (20th)	6.0% (12th)
11	May 31, 2018	5.7% (NR)	6.8%	5.3% (19th)	6.3% (14th)
12	May 31, 2018	6.2% (19th)	7.3%	5.9% (15th)	7.1% (10th)
13	June 6, 2018 (Note: No episodes were aired on June 7 due to coverage of the FIFA Friendly soccer match between South Korea and Bolivia.)	4.7%	4.9%	4.3% (NR)	4.5% (NR)
14	June 6, 2018	4.9%	5.1%	4.5% (NR)	4.7% (NR)
15	June 14, 2018 (Note: No episodes were aired on June 13 due to election day news coverage.)	7.4%	7.6%	3.4% (NR)	3.5% (NR)
16	June 14, 2018	7.9%	8.2%	7.9% (NR)	8.0% (NR)
17	June 21, 2018 (Note: No episodes were aired on June 20 due to live coverage of the 2018 FIFA World Cup Group B match between Portugal and Morocco.)	5.0%	5.3%	3.7% (NR)	3.8% (NR)
18	June 21, 2018	5.8%	6.0%	4.9% (19th)	4.9% (20th)
19	June 28, 2018 (Note: No episodes were aired on June 27 due to live coverage of the 2018 FIFA World Cup Group F match between South Korea and Germany. Aired 30 minutes earlier due to live coverage of the 2018 FIFA World Cup Group H match between Japan and Poland.)	3.0%	3.5%	2.6% (NR)	3.4% (NR)
20	June 28, 2018	4.9%	5.7%	5.2% (20th)	5.6% (18th)
21	July 4, 2018	3.9%	4.6%	3.8% (NR)	4.9% (NR)
22	July 4, 2018	5.6%	6.4%	5.2% (20th)	5.6% (18th)
23	July 5, 2018	4.5%	5.3%	4.1% (NR)	4.8% (NR)
24	July 5, 2018	5.7%	6.5%	5.3% (16th)	5.7% (12th)
25	July 11, 2018	4.1%	5.0%	3.7% (NR)	4.4% (NR)
26	July 11, 2018	5.2%	5.9%	4.7% (NR)	5.6% (NR)
27	July 12, 2018	5.9%	6.8%	4.3% (NR)	5.0% (NR)
28	July 12, 2018	6.9%	8.0%	5.8% (14th)	5.8% (13th)
29	July 18, 2018	4.8%	5.0%	4.2% (NR)	4.5% (NR)
30	July 18, 2018	6.0%	6.3%	5.4% (15th)	5.8% (14th)
31	July 19, 2018	5.3%	5.5%	5.1% (17th)	5.6% (16th)
32	July 19, 2018	6.6%	7.1%	5.9% (14th)	6.5% (9th)
Average		5.4%	5.9%	4.5%	5.0%

- Regular broadcast of the drama was pre-empted on June 7, 13, 20 and 27 due to the coverage of 2018 World Cup and local elections.
- Episodes 19 and 20 were aired at 9:30 and 10PM instead of regular programming time of 10 and 10:30PM due to coverage of the 2018 World Cup.

== Awards and nominations ==
Award	Category	Recipient	Result	Ref.
6th APAN Star Awards	Best Supporting Actor	Huh Joon-ho	Nominated	
6th APAN Star Awards	Best Supporting Actress	Seo Jeong-yeon	Nominated	
2nd The Seoul Awards	Best Supporting Actor	Huh Joon-ho	Nominated	
2nd The Seoul Awards	Best New Actor	Jang Ki-yong	Nominated	
2nd The Seoul Awards	Special Acting Award	Huh Joon-ho	Won	
2018 MBC Drama Awards	Drama of the Year	Come and Hug Me	Nominated	
2018 MBC Drama Awards	Top Excellence Award, Actor in a Wednesday-Thursday Miniseries	Huh Joon-ho	Nominated	
2018 MBC Drama Awards	Excellence Award, Actor in a Wednesday-Thursday Drama	Jang Ki-yong	Won	
2018 MBC Drama Awards	Excellence Award, Actress in a Wednesday-Thursday Drama	Jin Ki-joo	Nominated	
2018 MBC Drama Awards	Best Supporting Cast in Wednesday-Thursday Miniseries	Kim Seo-hyung	Nominated	
2018 MBC Drama Awards	Best Supporting Cast in Wednesday-Thursday Miniseries	Seo Jeong-yeon	Nominated	
2018 MBC Drama Awards	PD Award	Huh Joon-ho	Won	
2018 MBC Drama Awards	Golden Acting Award	Huh Joon-ho	Won	
2018 MBC Drama Awards	Best New Actor	Kim Kyung-nam	Won	
2018 MBC Drama Awards	Best Young Actress	Ryu Han-bi	Won	
2018 MBC Drama Awards	Best Couple Award	Jang Ki-yong and Jin Ki-joo	Won	
23rd Asian Television Awards	Best Drama Series	Come and Hug Me	Nominated	
55th Baeksang Arts Awards	Best New Actor	Jang Ki-yong	Won	
