= Hwang Seung-eon =

South Korean actress (born 1988)

- 황승언
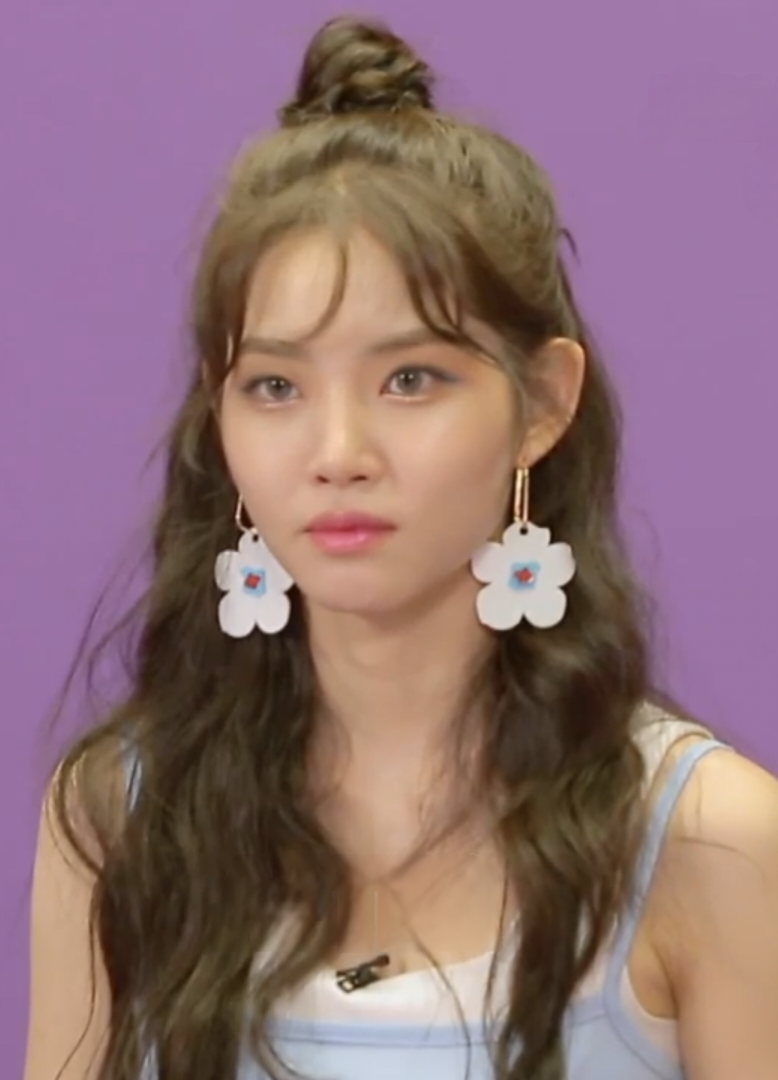
- Hwang in 2018
- Born: Hwang Seung-eon; October 31, 1988 (age 37); Yeonhui-dong, Seodaemun District, Seoul, South Korea
- Other names: Hwang Seung-un; Soo-ah; Sooah
- Education: Kyung Hee University – Department of Theatre and Film
- Occupations: Actress; model; singer
- Years active: 2009–present
- Agents: Urban Works Media; YG; YG KPlus; Big Picture; C-JeS
- Height: 1.67 m (5 ft 6 in)
- Awards: Full list
- Musical career
- Genres: K-pop
- Instrument: Vocals
- Years active: 2017–present
- Labels: YG; YG KPlus

Korean name
- Hangul: 황승언
- RR: Hwang Seungeon
- MR: Hwang Sŭngŏn

Hwang Seung-eon (Korean: 황승언; born October 31, 1988) is a South Korean actress, model and singer. She was a member of the co-ed project group Temporary Idols under YG Entertainment. She has appeared in numerous films, television series, variety shows, and music videos. She is best known for her roles in Let's Eat 2 (2015), Madame Antoine: The Love Therapist (2016), Love for a Thousand More (2016), Time (2018), XX (2020), When I Was the Most Beautiful (2020) and Alice (2020).

== Early life ==
Hwang was born in Yeonhui-dong, Seodaemun District, Seoul, South Korea on October 31, 1988. She attended Anyang Arts High School and graduated from Kyung Hee University. She started acting when she was in her third year of high school, and she was also an idol trainee.

== Career ==
=== 2009–2013: Career beginnings ===
Hwang Seung-eon started her entertainment career by appearing as a friend of actress Im Jung-eun in MBC's entertainment program, Introduce the Star's Friend, which was broadcast in December 2008.

She made her acting debut in 2009, in the horror film A Blood Pledge as Park Ji-mi, which was released on June 18, 2009. In August 2009, she starred in the horror film Yoga Hakwon. She made a cameo in City of Fathers playing the role as Mina. In 2010, Hwang made her television series debut in the 2010 MBC TV Golden Fish, playing the role of Yoon Myeong-ji, a housekeeper. In December 2011, she played Lee Joo-hee, a ghost who haunts Yeo-ri (Son Ye-jin) in the horror film, Spellbound, starring Son Ye-jin and Lee Min-ki. She was also cast in Drama Special – Ji-hoon's Born in 1982.

In 2012, Hwang was cast as the lead in the short film The Trinity and also Whatcha Wearin'?.

=== 2014–2016: Rising popularity and departure from Urban Works Media ===
She made several cameos in films and appeared in short films in 2014. Her popularity rose after her lead role in The King of Jokgu, where she was nominated for the Best New Actress at the 2nd Wildflower Film Awards. It was announced that Hwang would be cast in the OCN drama Bad Guys and MBC Every 1's Sweden Laundry. In 2015, Hwang joined the cast of Heart to Heart which aired on January 9, 2015. She also starred on Sweet 20. She gained more attention after she was cast in Let's Eat 2.

Hwang was cast as the lead in the JTBC drama Madame Antoine: The Love Therapist along with actor Han Ye-seul and Sung Joon which was delayed to January 22, 2016, after the originally planned November 27, 2015. Later that year, she made a cameo in Signal before she was cast as the main lead of Thumping Spike.

She officially left Urban Works Media in 2016.

=== 2016–present: YG Entertainment, music debut and continued success ===
Hwang joined YG Entertainment and its model agency YG KPlus on October 26, 2016. She then starred as the female lead in the YG produced web series, Love for a Thousand More aired on December 5, 2016.

Hwang was nominated for the Golden Acting Award, Actress in a Miniseries at the 2017 MBC Drama Awards for her role in Man Who Dies to Live. She made a cameo in Jugglers before taking up a supporting role in I'm Not a Robot. Together with Kim Hee-jung, Lee Su-hyun, Kwon Hyun-bin and Kwon Young-deuk, Hwang was part of the project group Temporary Idols formed by YG Entertainment in collaboration with SBS for the television series of the same name. The drama was aired on SBS and Netflix. They released 2 songs, "Red Carpet" and "Ice Cafe".

In January 2018, Hwang was cast as Lee Roo-mi in the web series XX. Hwang, alongside Kim Jung-hyun, Seohyun and Kim Jun-han starred in MBC melodrama Time. She was nominated for the Excellence Award, Actress in a Wednesday-Thursday Miniseries at the 2018 MBC Drama Awards. She made a cameo in Touch Your Heart and starred in the tvN Drama Stage My Uncle is Audrey Hepburn. With Im Soo-hyang, Ji Soo and Ha Seok-jin, Hwang was cast as the lead role in When I Was the Most Beautiful where she was nominated for Excellence Award, Actress in a Wednesday-Thursday Miniseries at the 2020 MBC Drama Awards. It was announced that Hwang would be starring in the science-fiction television series Alice.

In January 2021, Hwang signed with C-JeS Entertainment. Hwang was part of the cast of You Are My Spring aired on July 5, 2021. She also made a cameo in Police University in 2021.

In March 2022, Hwang confirmed to join KakaoTV original drama, Marriage White Paper alongside Lee Jin-wook and Lee Yeon-hee. She will play as Choi Hee-sun, a co-worker of Na-eun (Lee Yeon-hee). This drama will broadcast within this year.

== Discography ==
=== Singles ===
List of singles, showing year released, selected peak positions, sales figures, and name of the album
Title	Year	Peak chart positions		Sales	Album
Title	Year	KOR Gaon	KOR Hot	Sales	Album
Collaborations
"Red Carpet" (with Kim Hee-jung, Lee Su-hyun, Kwon Hyun-bin and Kwon Young-deuk)	2017	—	—	—N/a	Temporary Idols
"Ice Cafe" (with Kim Hee-jung, Lee Su-hyun, Kwon Hyun-bin and Kwon Young-deuk)	2017	—	—	—N/a	Temporary Idols
"—" denotes releases that did not chart or were not released in that region.

== Filmography ==
=== Film ===
Year	Title		Role	Notes	Ref.
Year	English	Korean	Role	Notes	Ref.
2009	A Blood Pledge	여고괴담 5: 동반자살	Park Ji-mi		
2009	Yoga Hakwon	요가학원	Lee Bo-ra		
2009	City of Fathers	부산	Mi-na		
2011	Spellbound	오싹한 연애	Lee Joo-hee		
2012	The Trinity	영화의 완성	Ji-kyung	Short film	
2012	Whatcha Wearin'?	나의 P.S. 파트너	Choi Young-ah		
2013	Interactive Movie [NAVI]	네비: 生과 死의 선택	Woman	Short film	
2014	Miss Granny	수상한 그녀	Female college student applying make-up	Cameo	
2014	The King of Jokgu	족구왕	Seo Ahn-na		
2014	Slow Video	슬로우 비디오	Heroine	Cameo	
2014	Spring Colds	소녀들		Short film	
2014	귀향	귀향	Mi-ja	Short film	
2014	열대야	열대야	Soo-yeon	Short film	
2016	With or Without You	우리 연애의 이력	Ha Yi-rin		
2016	Familyhood	굿바이 싱글	Award ceremony woman	Cameo	
2016	The Queen of Crime	범죄의 여왕		Cameo	
2017	The King	더 킹	Jun Hee-sung		
2018	Memento Mori	메멘토모리	Do-hee		
2022	New Normal	소름		Closing film at 26th Bucheon International Fantastic Film Festival	

=== Television series ===
Year	Title		Role	Notes	Ref.
Year	English	Korean	Role	Notes	Ref.
2010	Golden Fish	황금물고기	Yoon Myung-ji		
2011	Drama Special: "Ji-hoon's Born in 1982"	82년생 지훈이	Park Joo-mi		
2014	Quiz of God 4	신의 퀴즈	Ahn Hyo-yeon	Cameo (episode 3)	
2014	Bad Guys	나쁜 녀석들	Yang Yoo-jin		
2014	Sweden Laundry	스웨덴 세탁소	Kim Eun-sol		
2015	Heart to Heart	하트 투 하트	Woo Yeon-woo		
2015	Let's Eat 2	식샤를 합시다 2	Hwang Hye-rim		
2016	Madame Antoine: The Love Therapist	마담 앙트완	Ko Yoo-rim		
2016	Signal	시그널	Han Do-yeon	Cameo (episode 13)	
2016	Thumping Spike	두근두근 스파이크	Kang Se-ra		
2017	Man Who Dies to Live	죽어야 사는 남자	Yang Yang (Yang Mi-hwa)		
2017	Jugglers	저글러스	Secretary Kang	Cameo	
2017	I'm Not a Robot	로봇이 아니야	Ye Ri-el		
2017	Temporary Idols / Part-Time Idol	비정규직 아이돌	Soo-ah		
2018	The Time	시간	Eun Chae-ah		
2019	Touch Your Heart	진심이 닿다	Actress	Cameo (episode 4)	
2019	Drama Stage: "My Uncle is Audrey Hepburn"	삼촌은 오드리헵번	Nabi		
2020	When I Was the Most Beautiful	내가 가장 예뻤을때	Carrie Jung		
2020	Alice	앨리스	Oh Shi-young		
2021	You Are My Spring	너는 나의 봄	Jin-ho		
2021	Police University	경찰수업	Kim Eun-joo	Cameo (episode 5)	
2022	Andante of Love	사랑의 안단테	Ha Na-kyung		

=== Web series ===
Year	Title		Role	Notes	Ref.
Year	English	Korean	Role	Notes	Ref.
2015	Sweet 20	달콤청춘	Bae Yoon-ha		
2016	Love for a Thousand More	천년째 연애중	Pyun Mi-jo	Lead role	
2020	XX	엑스엑스	Lee Roo-mi	Lead role	
2022	Goosebumps – Soreum	소름 – 기담	Hye-yeon	8 short dramas	
2022	New Normal Gene	뉴노멀진	Song Ro-ji		
2022	Welcome to Wedding Hell	결혼백서	Choi Hee-sun		

=== Television shows ===
Year	Title		Role	Notes	Ref.
Year	English	Korean	Role	Notes	Ref.
2015	SNL Korea	새터데이 나이트 라이브 코리아	Cast member	Season 6	
2016	King of Mask Singer	미스터리 음악쇼 복면가왕	Contestant	Episode 57–58	

=== Hosting ===
Year	Title	Notes	Ref.
2021	opening ceremony 17th Jecheon International Music & Film Festival	with Jung Sung-hwa	

=== Music video appearances ===
Year	Song title	Artist	Ref.
2009	"It Hurts So Bae" (가슴이 아파요)	Shin Jae	
2010	"One Love"	Suki featuring Kahi	
2010	"Don't Go" (가지 말아요)	Zia	
2011	"Replay"	Kim Dong-ryul	
2014	"Until the Day" (잘 지내자, 우리)	Zitten	
2014	"Her" (그녀)	Epitone Project	
2015	"Ma First" (니가 처음이야)	Jang Hyun-seung featuring Giriboy	

== Awards and nominations ==
Name of the award ceremony, year presented, category, nominee of the award, and the result of the nomination
Award ceremony	Year	Category	Nominee / Work	Result	Ref.
MBC Drama Awards	2017	Golden Acting Award, Actress in a Miniseries	Man Who Dies to Live	Nominated	
MBC Drama Awards	2018	Excellence Award, Actress in a Wednesday-Thursday Miniseries	Time	Nominated	
MBC Drama Awards	2020	Excellence Award, Actress in a Wednesday-Thursday Miniseries	When I Was the Most Beautiful	Nominated	
Wildflower Film Awards	2015	Best New Actress	The King of Jokgu	Nominated	
