= We Broke Up (web series) =

- Also known as: We've Broken Up
- Genre: Romance; Drama; Musical
- Based on: We Broke Up by Ryu Chae-rin
- Written by: Jeon Seon-yeong
- Directed by: Kim Yong-wan; Kim Ki-yoon
- Starring: Sandara Park; Kang Seung-yoon; Kang Seung-hyun; Jang Ki-yong
- Country of origin: South Korea
- Original language: Korean
- No. of episodes: 10

Production
- Producer: Kim Ki-yoon
- Production location: Korea
- Running time: Mondays, Wednesdays and Fridays at 19:00 (KST)
- Production companies: CJ E&M; YG K-Plus; Story Plant (Note: Now Mega Monster, a joint venture of kakao M and Studio Dragon)

Original release
- Network: Naver TV Cast; OnStyle
- Release: 29 June – 17 July 2015

We Broke Up (Korean: 우리 헤어졌어요; RR: Uri heeojeosseoyo) is a South Korean web series based on the Naver/Line webtoon of the same name, starring Sandara Park and Kang Seung-yoon (both from YG Entertainment).

== Plot ==
Ji Won-young is an aspiring musician and the lead singer of a band while Noh Woo-ri is a college student. After meeting at one of Won-young's gigs, their relationship blossomed and they soon begin living together. Things become complicated when they decide to part ways but due to various problems with the security deposit and the loan on the apartment, they are forced to remain living together until the contract is up. Since the two are too rebellious towards each other, they end up formulating few rules for living which included not interfering in each other's life. However, Won-young's sudden suggestion of non interference in each other's love life, concerns Woo-ri and she becomes worried that Won-young already has plans of moving on soon after their break up. The same day Won-young discovers that the band's department no longer belongs to them and decides to work as a part-time in a store, there he happens to meet Yoon Ni-na, who later, on purpose takes Won-young's phone along while he is billing and leaves hers behind that was identical to his. Meanwhile, Woo-ri seems to be worried about Won-young not returning home at night and wonders if he has already started dating. The next day, she thinks a lot about calling him but tries to convince herself not to since they've already broken up. However, she ends up calling him, but when she discovers the phone to have been picked up by a woman, she immediately hangs up. She then receives a message for an interview and determines to get a job. On the other hand, Ni-na calls up Won-young and asks him to return her phone, who is at first reluctant to do so, but then agrees when offered 300 dollars. He then goes and discovers Ni-na to be a music director who offers him a job for his band The Band I Do Not Know. He asks his band members to arrive at once and they do so. They have a wonderful program that reassures Ni-na about their talent, and she pays them sufficiently. Woo-ri ends up at a library and meets a former classmate Seo Hyun-woo, while they both pick up the same book for the same interview, they study the whole night but Woo-ri ends up sleeping. Hyun-woo looks at her presentation and modifies it a bit to make it just perfect. The next day the two wake up in library late for the interview and rush to the office without changing. During her presentation, Woo-ri gets nervous on seeing a new presentation but boosts up on the very next slide. Both Hyun-woo and Woo-ri get selected for Gaha Entertainment at different positions. They get to work on the first day of the job while Won-young signs an agreement to work with Ni-na. The Band I Do Not Know members celebrate at home along with Ni-na and on the other hand, Woo-ri brings along Hyun-woo to celebrate their first day at job and after seeing the band celebrating, those two join them too. Woo-ri and Won-young envy each other's new partners. With this love hate relation, how will the two reconcile?

== Cast ==
- Sandara Park as Noh Woo-ri
- Kang Seung-yoon as Ji Won-young
- Kang Seung-hyun as Yoon Ni-na
- Jang Ki-yong as Seo Hyun-woo
- Lee Bum-gyu as Goo Hyun-dong
- Kim Kyu-ho as Han Shim-hoon
- Lee Se-young as Ji-min

=== Special appearances ===
- Choi Ji-woo as herself (episode 3)
- Park Sang-hyun as himself (episode 4)
- Yoo In-na as herself/DJ (episode 8)
- Joo Woo-jae as himself/DJ (episode 8)

== Episodes ==
| Episode # | Original broadcast date | Episode title |
|---|---|---|
| 1 | 29 June 2015 | We Broke Up |
| 2 | 29 June 2015 | Breakup 101 |
| 3 | 1 July 2015 | Is It Coincidence Or Destiny? |
| 4 | 3 July 2015 | 23, 26 |
| 5 | 6 July 2015 | I Don't Know You Anymore |
| 6 | 8 July 2015 | Off Beat, Out Of Sync |
| 7 | 10 July 2015 | A Half Share Of Memories |
| 8 | 13 July 2015 | 0+1 |
| 9 | 15 July 2015 | How To Remove A Band-aid |
| 10 | 17 July 2015 | Again, It's Spring |

== Production ==
We Broke Up is a live-action adaption of a popular webtoon bearing the same name. Co-directing the anticipated web-drama is Director Kim Yong-wan, who also co-directed the successful hit "Love Cells" starring former child-actress Kim Yoo-jung, which was recently revived for another season.

The series is jointly planned and produced by YG K-Plus, CJ E&M Digital Studio and Story Plant. On April 22, 2015, the first script reading was held successfully.

The web-drama was released officially under CJ E&M Style Studio, YG Entertainment, and YG K-Plus' digital platforms all on the same date.

== Reception ==
The 10 episode web-drama was a smashing success. Amassing views of over 16 million, We Broke Up was the 4th most-viewed web-drama of 2015. Kang Seung-yoon was nominated and awarded 'Best Actor' for his role as Ji Won-yeong by K-web Fest. Dara was unable to be nominated for her role as she was already nominated for a previous leading role in another web-drama entitled 'Dr. Ian', for which she won 'Best Actress'.

As thanks for the positive reception, the cast of the show held a personal 'mini concert' on August 17.

The success continued when it was invited to be screened at the 21st Geneva International Film Festival, becoming the first of its kind to do so. The series was screened on November 7.
