= Kim Hee-jung (actress, born 1992) =

South Korean actress (born 1992)

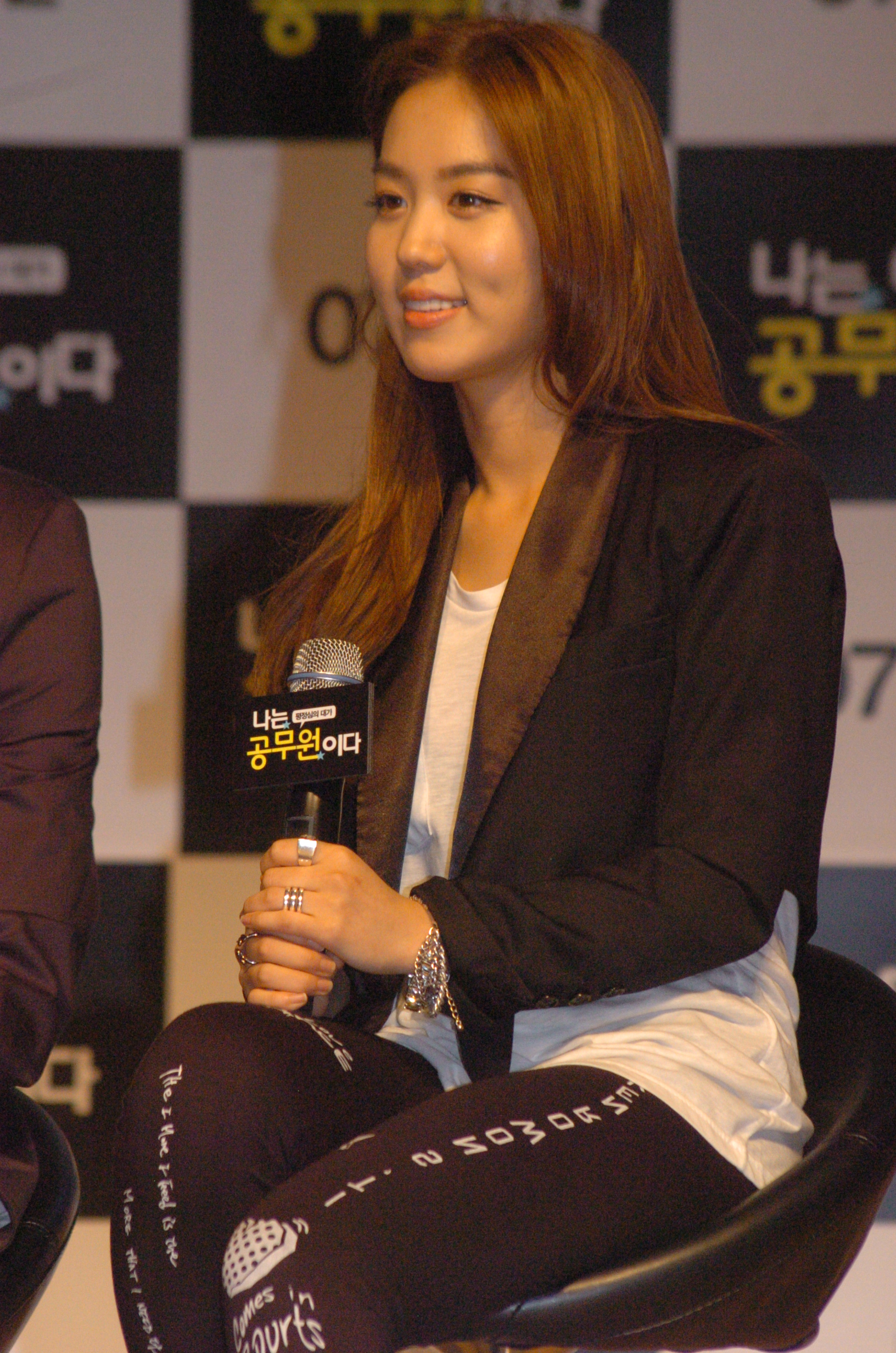
- Kim in June 2012
- Born: April 16, 1992 (age 34); Bucheon, South Korea
- Education: Chung-Ang University - Theater and Film
- Occupation: Actress
- Years active: 2000–present
- Agent: Sublime

Korean name
- Hangul: 김희정
- RR: Gim Huijeong
- MR: Kim Hŭijŏng

Kim Hee-jung (Korean: 김희정; born April 16, 1992) is a South Korean actress. She made her acting debut in 2000 as a child actress, playing the titular character in Kkokji (also known as Tough Guy's Love). As Kim reached her early twenties, one of her notable roles was Gwanghae's queen consort in the 2014 period drama The King's Face. In May 2016, Kim signed with YG Entertainment. In August 2019, she left YG Entertainment and signed with Sublime Artist Agency. She is also a member of the South Korean female dance crew Purplow, known by the stage name Bibi.

== Filmography ==
=== Film ===
Year	Title	Role	Notes	Ref.
2004	Spider Forest	Girl		
2004	So Cute	Chick		
2008	My Dear Enemy	So-yeon		
2012	Dangerously Excited	Saku		
2014	Sabra		short film	
2015	Han River	Maria		
2015	The End of the World	Ahn Ye-jin		
2022	Booginite	Kyung-ah		
2023	Marrying the Mafia	Yeonsu		
TBA	Labang	Su-jin		

=== Television series ===
Year	Title	Role
2000	Tough Guy's Love	Song Kkok-ji
2001	Piano	young Han Joo-hee
2001	Ladies in the Palace	Dal-rae
2001	Hotelier	Soo-jin (guest, episode 6)
2002	Magic Kid Masuri	Choi Yi-seul
2005	The Hard Goodbye	Lee Ji-won
2005	General of Dokdo, An Yong-bok	Hyun-jung
2006	Love Truly	Soo-jung
2007	The Innocent Woman	Oh Hyun-myung
2007	High Kick!	Lee Min-ho's schoolgirl crush (guest, episode 164)
2012	KBS Drama Special: "The Brightest Moment in Life"	Seo-jung
2013	The Greatest Thing in the World	Ja-yoo
2014	The King's Face	Seo Jabin of the Yu clan (later Queen Munseong)
2015	Who Are You: School 2015	Cha Song-joo
2015	Splendid Politics	Gang-bin
2015	Delicious Love	Han Jun-hee
2016	Love for a Thousand More	Yeon-ji
2016	Yeong-joo	Yeong-joo
2017	The Rebel	Baek Gyeon
2017	Reunited Worlds	Nam Yoo-min
2017	Temporary Idols	Kim Hee-jung
2018	Return	Kang Young-eun
2019	Touch Your Heart	Kim Hae-young
2021	River Where the Moon Rises	Tarajin
2021	Emergency	Nurse Kim
2022	Sponsor	Park Da-hye

=== Variety shows ===
Year	Title	Notes
2014	Super Bike	Host
2015	The Human Condition Season 2	Guest
2015	Law of the Jungle	Guest (episode 184-185)
2015	Radio Star	Guest (episode 449)
2016	Hit the Stage	Judge
2018	Mimi Shop	Guest (episode 17)
2021	Kick A Goal Season 2	Cast (episode 17)
2022	Running Man	Guest (episode 597)

=== Music video appearances ===
Year	Song title	Artist
2013	"The Ceiling"	Bumzu
2014	"Not That Kind of Person"	M.Pire
2015	"Trauma"	Eun Ji-won
2015	"Bounce"	Boyfriend
2016	"Rendezvous"	Sik-K

== Discography ==
=== Singles ===
Year	Song title	Artist	Notes
2009	"Love & Dung"	Tata Clan feat. Kim Da-hye and Kim Hee-jung	Track 1 from the EP Love & Dung
