= Shin Won-ho (director) =

South Korean director and television producer

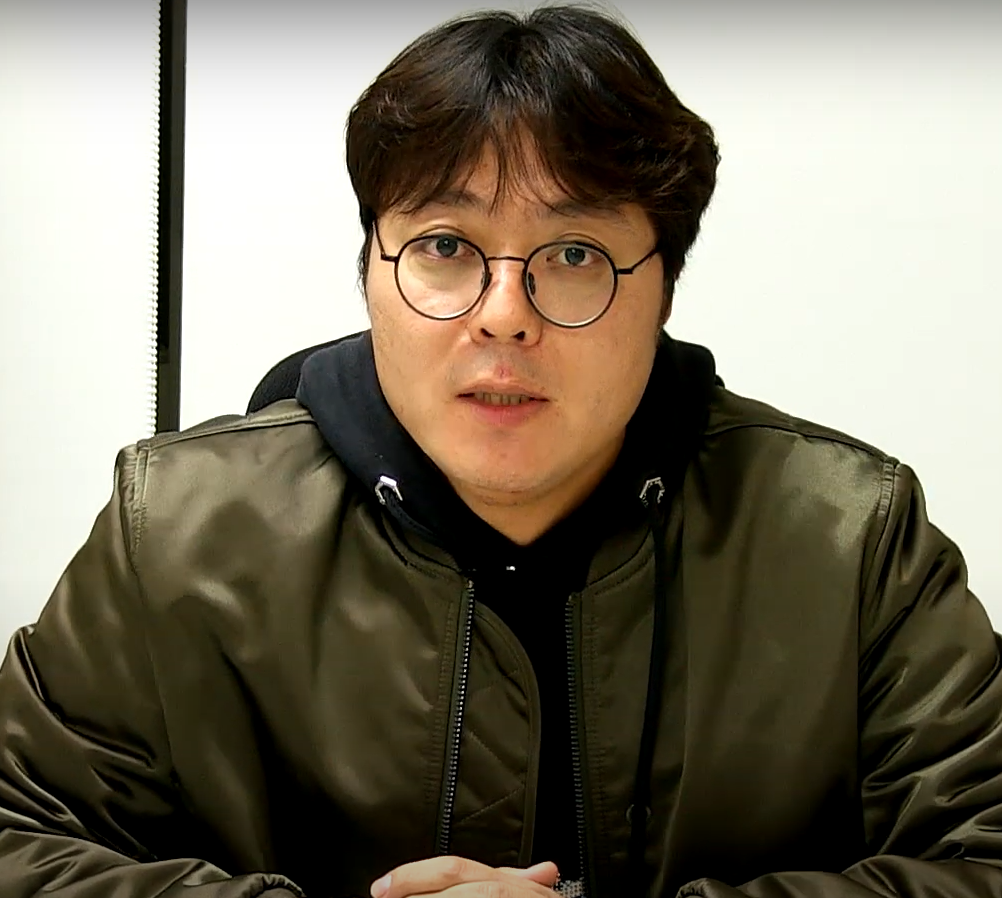
- Shin in May 2019
- Born: August 28, 1975 (age 51); Seoul, South Korea
- Education: Seoul National University
- Occupations: Director, television producer
- Agent(s): tvN, CJ E&M

Korean name
- Hangul: 신원호
- Hanja: 申元浩
- RR: Sin Wonho
- MR: Sin Wŏnho

Shin Won-ho (Korean: 신원호; born August 28, 1975) is a South Korean director and television producer. He directed the 2004 sitcom Old Miss Diary, variety shows Star Golden Bell and Qualifications of Men. After moving to CJ E&M in 2011, he directed tvN's anthology series Reply, Prison Playbook, and Hospital Playlist.

== Education ==
Shin was born in Seoul on August 28, 1975. Despite wanting to major in entertainment at Hanyang University, his homeroom teacher and father compelled him to choose a science major in high school. He paid attention to getting into college due to Garak High School being a new school. Eventually, his father submitted the application form for a science major.

Shin enrolled in Seoul National University's College of Engineering, majoring in Chemical Engineering. He volunteered with a film company as staff and completed his studies in Chemical Engineering in 2001, earning a Bachelor's degree. He also pursued a minor in Communications.

== Career ==
=== Career in KBS ===
Shin applied to KBS during the 27th KBS Open Recruitment and joined as a staff member in KBS Entertainment. He said, "For jobs that require creativity like PD, there are advantages (as a chemical engineer)." Shin began his career as an assistant director in the network's variety department. His first work was The World is Now.

In 2002, he was assistant director to Lee Myung-han in the show Declaration of Freedom Today is Saturday. The program revolved around male entertainers and female college students who would meet and find a mate at a mountain lodge. It was during this program that Shin collaborated with fellow assistant director Na Yeong-seok and Lee Woo-jung, who served as the main writer. Together, they gained recognition as a group known as the Yeouido Research Institute, (Note: Yeouido Research Institute is a small group consisting of Lee Myung-han, Na Young-seok, Shin Won-ho, and writer Lee Woo-jung.) later also known as Lee Myung-han's division.

In 2002, when Lee Myung-han was in charge of directing Super TV Sunday is Fun, his juniors took on the responsibility of directing each segment of the show. Shin directed Kung Kung Ta, while Na Young-seok directed Let's Go! Dream Team – Season 1.

In 2004, Shin took on the role of assistant director for the quiz show Star Golden Bell. Concurrently, he was also assigned as assistant director for the KBS daily sitcom Old Miss Diary, which was directed by Kim Seok-yun. The sitcom aired from November 22, 2004 to November 4, 2005.

Shin made a comeback to the entertainment industry as the main director of Heroine 6, a sequel to Heroine 5. Heroine 6 was one of the segments of the show Happy Sunday, produced and directed by Lee Myung-han. Shin took over as director when Lee Myung-han and Na Young-seok were working on another segment for Happy Sunday. The show aired on KBS2 from May 8, 2005 to April 29, 2007.

From 2009 to 2011, Shin held the position of the main director for the variety show Qualifications of Men. During this time, he was honored with the Korea PD Award for Best Entertainment Work as well as the Minister of Culture, Sports and Tourism Award in the Broadcasting and Video Grand Prix at the Korea Contents Awards. Additionally, he received recognition at the 17th Korea Entertainment and Arts Awards, where he was awarded the Best Entertainment Program and the 47th ABU Award in the Entertainment category.

In 2011, Shin submitted his resignation letter to KBS and transferred to CJ E&M.

=== Career in CJ E&M ===
After his move, Shin focused on exploring new possibilities in reality programming, drawing from his experience at KBS. In November 2011, news speculated that Shin's comeback would be a reality program. However, tvN director Song Chang-eui suggested Shin try directing a drama with a drama writer. Shin declined the offer due to concerns that his role would be diminished if a drama writer took over, reducing him to a "Jjiksae" (an insignificant figure). He expressed his willingness to take on the project only if he could have the opportunity to create a fresh version and test it out. Eventually, Song Chang-eui agreed to his condition, and Shin formed a production team including writer Lee Woo-jung and other entertainment writers.

In April 2012, tvN revealed that Shin was directing a drama titled Reply 1997, scheduled to air in June. Lee Myung-han served as executive producers, with Lee Woo-jung as the scriptwriter. This project was significant for Shin, as it marked his first work at CJ E&M after transferring from KBS in July of the previous year. After a month-long delay, the first self-produced drama by tvN, Reply 1997, was broadcast on July 24, 2012.

Reply 1997 revolves around six friends from Busan. The story timeline shifts between their past as high school in 1997 and their present reunion in 2012, where a couple gets engaged. The show explores the growing popularity of fan culture in the 1990s with K-pop groups like H.O.T. and Sechs Kies. Reply 1997 depicts the IMF crisis and the political situation of that time. Being a cable drama, it had the freedom to present a detailed and realistic portrayal of the era, while also having an exciting romantic storyline. Reply 1997 initially attracted viewers in their 30s, but gained popularity among a wider age range, including people in their 50s. The drama's storytelling approach with memory, nostalgia, and retro elements appealed to different generations. Additionally, the success of Reply 1997 sparked a revival of 1990s popular culture and a retro craze.

In April 2013, tvN announced the second installment of the Reply series: Reply 1994. Despite having the same writer, director, and producer as Reply 1997, is not a prequel. It maintains the concept of a coming-of-age drama with 1990s nostalgia but introduces a new plot and characters. Initially, Lee Woo-jung and Shin planned to set the first Reply series in 1994, the year they were college freshmen. However, after casting Eun Ji-won from Sechs Kies, they changed the year to 1997. This decision was influenced by the peak popularity of H.O.T. and Sechs Kies fandoms in 1997, which created a contrast to the struggling Korean economy during the IMF crisis.

Reply 1994 depicts the lives of college students hailing from various provinces who share a boarding house in Seoul. The drama features an ensemble cast, including Go Ara, Jung Woo, Yoo Yeon-seok, Kim Sung-kyun, Son Ho-jun, Baro, Min Do-hee, Sung Dong-il, and Lee Il-hwa. The drama reached a record-breaking viewership rating of 14.3%. Lee Woo-jung and Shin, gained a lot of attention because of this success.

In October 2015, Lee Myung-han, director of tvN, announced a lineup of dramas to celebrate tvN's 10th anniversary, which began in November with the third installment of the Reply series called Reply 1988. The drama features an ensemble cast, including Lee Hye-ri, Ryu Jun-yeol, Go Kyung-pyo, Park Bo-gum, and Lee Dong-hwi. Set in 1988, the story revolves around five friends and their families who live in the same neighborhood called Ssangmun-dong in Northern Seoul. The drama aired every Friday and Saturday from November 6, 2015 to January 16, 2016, totaling 20 episodes. Its final episode achieved an 18.8% nationwide audience share, making it the sixth highest rated drama in Korean cable television history and highest rated television drama at the time of airing.

Reply series was successful in terms of viewership and popularity, despite the challenging Korean climate for seasonal dramas. Lee Myung-Han further explained the success of the Reply series with black swan theory.

In May 2016, Shin and Lee Woo-jung started planning for black comedy drama Prison Playbook. A junior writer from the Reply series, Jeong Bo-hoon, wrote the script, while Lee Woo-jung served as a creator. The drama depicts the story of superstar baseball player Kim Je-hyeok, who became a criminal overnight and thrown into prison, and the lives of the people living in prison with him. The series became one of the highest-rated series in Korean cable television history.

Following the success of Prison Playbook, Shin again collaborated with Lee Woo-jung in creating the television series Hospital Playlist. It is the second installment of the Wise Life series, following Prison Playbook. They also reunited with two actors from their past dramas, Jung Kyung-ho from Prison Playbook, and Yoo Yeon-seok from Reply 1994. The series also features Jo Jung-suk, Kim Dae-myung, and Jeon Mi-do. These doctors, who are in their forties, work at the Yulje Medical Centre, and their friendship was established during their time in medical school.

The first season of the show was broadcast on tvN every Thursday from March 12 to May 28, 2020. Following their television airing, each episode was made available on Netflix in South Korea, Asia-Pacific, Latin America and in the English-speaking countries. (Note: For Japan and rest of the world, all episodes (season 1) were launched at once on April 6, 2020.) By the end of the first season, it had achieved the status of being the ninth highest-rated Korean drama in cable television history at the time. The second season was aired from June 17 to September 16, 2021. According to Nielsen Korea, the first episode garnered 10.007% viewership, setting a network record for the highest premiere ratings.

Shin gave a lecture on the subject of "the production process and behind-the-scenes of broadcasting programs" at the SAC Youth Broadcasting Writer Camp held at the Sakarirang Hall in the main building of Seoul National University of Arts.

As of January 2023, Shin joined CJ E&M subsidiary Eggs is Coming.

== Personal life ==
Shin married his wife in 2005. In 2018, he mentioned that they had two daughters in elementary school, one was in 5th grade, while the other was in 2nd grade (born in 2009).

== Filmography ==
=== Television show ===
Year	Title		Network	Credited as		Ref.
Year	English	Korean	Network	Assistant Director	Director	Ref.
2001	The world is now	세계는 지금	KBS2	Yes	No	
2001–2003	Declaration of Freedom Today is Saturday – The War Of Roses	자유선언 토요대작전 - 산장미팅 장미의 전쟁	KBS2	Yes	No	
2002	Super TV Sunday is Fun — Kung Kung Ta	슈퍼 TV 일요일은 즐거워 — 공포의 쿵쿵따	KBS2	Yes	No	
2004	Star Golden Bell	스타골든벨	KBS2	No	Yes	
2005–2007	Happy Sunday: Heroine 6 (Note: The show originally aired from May 8, 2005 to April 29, 2007)	여걸식스	KBS2	No	Yes	
2007	Happy Sunday: Immortal Songs	불후의 명곡	KBS2	No	Yes	
2009–2011	Happy Sunday: The Human Condition	남자의 자격	KBS2	No	Yes	
2017	Youth Over Flowers Laos	꽃보다 청춘	tvN	No	Yes	

=== Television series ===
Year	Title	Network	Credited as			Ref.
Year	Title	Network	Assistant Director	Director	Creator	Ref.
2004	Old Miss Diary	KBS2	Yes	No	No	
2012	Reply 1997	tvN	No	Yes	No	
2013	Reply 1994	tvN	No	Yes	No	
2016	Reply 1988	tvN	No	Yes	No	
2017	Prison Playbook	tvN	No	Yes	No	
2020–2021	Hospital Playlist (season 1–2)	tvN	No	Yes	No	
2025	Resident Playbook	tvN	No	No	Yes	

=== Music video ===
Year	Song title	Artist	Ref.
2021	"Don't Look Back"	Sechs Kies	

=== Recurring cast ===
Recurring casts
Actor Work	Lee Il-hwa	Jeon Mi-do	Jo Jung-suk	Jung Kyung-ho	Kim Dae-myung	Kim Sung-kyun	Sung Dong-il	Yoo Yeon-seok	Oh Yoon-ah
Old Miss Diary									^{1}
Reply 1997	^{2}						^{2}		
Reply 1994	^{2}					^{1}	^{2}	^{1}	
Reply 1988	^{2}					^{2}	^{2}		
Prison Playbook				^{1}			^{2}		
Hospital Playlist		^{1}	^{1}	^{1}	^{1}	^{3}	^{3}	^{1}	^{3}

Notes

- ^{1} Main Character
- ^{2} Supporting character
- ^{3} Cameo appearance only

== Accolades ==
=== Awards and nominations ===
List of award
Year	Award ceremony	Category	Recipient	Result	Ref.
2010	The 47th ABU Awards Entertainment Division Award	Best Entertainment Program Award	Happy Sunday – Qualifications of Men	Won	
2010	The 17th Korea Entertainment Arts Awards	Best Entertainment Program Award	Happy Sunday – Qualifications of Men	Won	
2011	23rd Korea PD Awards	Entertainment Works Award	Happy Sunday – Qualifications of Men	Won	
2012	7th A-Awards (Note: Hosted by Arena Homme Plus)	The Best Black Collar Workers of 2012 — Innovation Category	Reply 1997	Won	
2012	6th Media Awards Paid Broadcasting Content Variety	Excellence Award	Reply 1997	Won	
2014	7th Korea Drama Awards	Best Production Director	Reply 1994	Won	
2016	5th APAN Star Awards	Best Director	Reply 1988	Won	
2016	52nd Baeksang Arts Awards	Best Director – Television	Reply 1988	Won	
2016	YWCA Best TV Program Award	Special Award	Reply 1988	Won	
2016	tvN10 Awards	Grand Prize (Daesang), Drama	Reply 1988	Won	
2016	tvN10 Awards	Best Content Award, Drama	Reply 1988	Won	
2017	2nd Asia Artist Awards	Best Creator Awards	Reply 1988	Won	
2020	CJ ENM Visionary	2020 Visionary	Shin Won-ho	Won	

=== State honors ===
State honor
Country	Award Ceremony	Year	Honor	Ref.
South Korea	Korean Content Awards (Note: Honors are given at the Korean Content Awards (대한민국 콘텐츠 대상) arranged by the Korea Creative Content Agency and hosted by the Ministry of Culture, Sports and Tourism. The 2022 Korea Content Awards Ceremony, which started in 2009 and celebrated its 14th this year, aims to inspire pride in the content industry and develop the Korean cultural content industry by discovering and awarding contributors and excellent content that have contributed to the development of the content industry in 2022. It is a place to promote. The winners (works) of honor, which are recommended through the website of the Korea Creative Content Agency (www.kocca.kr) and announced through careful examination by experts and three-step verification, play a leading role in shining the Korean content industry in the world.)	2011	Grand Prix Award from the Minister of Culture, Sports and Tourism	
South Korea	Korean Content Awards	2020 (12th)	Presidential citation for Contribution to the development of the broadcasting and video industry (Hospital Playlist)	

=== Listicles ===
Name of publisher, year listed, name of listicle, and placement
Publisher	Year	Listicle	Placement	Ref.
Herald Economy	2015	Pop Culture Power Leader Big 30	19th	

== See also ==
- Lee Myung-han
- Lee Woo-jung
- Na Yeong-seok
