= Prison Playbook =

2017 South Korean television series

- Promotional poster
- Hangul: 슬기로운 감빵생활
- Hanja: 슬기로운 監房生活
- Lit.: Wise Prison Life
- RR: Seulgiroun gamppangsaenghwal
- MR: Sŭlgiroun kamppangsaenghwal
- Genre: Black comedy
- Created by: Lee Woo-jung
- Written by: Jung Bo-hoon
- Directed by: Shin Won-ho
- Starring: Park Hae-soo; Jung Kyung-ho
- Country of origin: South Korea
- Original language: Korean
- No. of episodes: 16

Production
- Executive producer: Park Sung-jae
- Producer: Park Soo-woo
- Camera setup: Single-camera
- Running time: 90 minutes
- Production company: tvN

Original release
- Network: tvN
- Release: November 22, 2017 – January 18, 2018

Prison Playbook (Korean: 슬기로운 감빵생활) is a 2017 South Korean television series directed by Shin Won-ho and starring Park Hae-soo and Jung Kyung-ho. The series marks Park's first-ever lead role. It aired on tvN from November 22, 2017 to January 18, 2018, every Wednesday and Thursday at 21:10 (KST) for 16 episodes.

The series was a commercial hit and became one of the highest-rated series in Korean cable television history.

== Plot ==
Kim Je-Hyuk is an ace baseball pitcher, who is slated to join Boston Red Sox and play the major league. His life changes overnight when he assaults a man who tries to sexually assault his sister Kim Je-Hee. He is sentenced to one year in prison due to excessive violence that resulted in the assailant's brain death.

In the detention center, he is disliked by a gangster and is stabbed in his left shoulder by his henchman Dong-ho. Since Je-Hyuk is a left-handed pitcher, his baseball career is seemingly ruined. However, with his relentless hard-work, he switches to right hand and trains diligently once he's transferred to Seobu Penitentiary. His childhood friend Lee Joon-ho stays by his side and helps him navigate prison life.

The show also tells the tales of Kim Je-Hyuk's cellmates and other people he befriends in Seobu Penitentiary:

Kim Min-chul was sentenced to life two decades ago for gang violence and murder of a person. Min-chul is a model prisoner who admits to and regrets his crime. He is released after serving 22 years in prison on a Christmas Special Pardon. A few weeks before his release, a young college student visits him for her thesis. Min-chul later recognizes her necklace and learns that she is his daughter. His wife has kept his imprisonment a secret, though she appreciates him for his character. Once released, he reunites with his daughter and Jean Veljean, his former cellmate whom he treats as his son.

Kang Chul-doo is a con-man. He is skilled, good with hands and nicknamed KAIST. He has been married six times and has a son Geon-U from whom he is estranged with since he hates him for being in jail and abandoning his mother and him for a rich woman. Chul-doo donates his liver to Geon-U when he suffers liver failure. He is abruptly transferred to another penitentiary for better medical facilities after the surgery.

Captain Yoo/ Yoo Jung-woo is imprisoned for brutally assaulting and killing his subordinate Private Park Jun-young. It is later revealed that he was unfairly framed by the politically connected Sergeant Oh. Jung-woo was actually a compassionate leader whom the soldiers liked, especially Jun-young who idolized him. Jung-woo is initially angry and aloof and later warms up to the cellmates. His brother, a professor, relentlessly prepares for his retrial at the cost of his own job. Jung-woo's retrial is approved and awaits his acquittal.

Yoo Han-Yang, a pharmacist from a rich family is sentenced for the use of illegal drugs. He is constantly drowsy and weak due to withdrawal. Han-yang was neglected as a child by his mother, who was busy running their restaurant. He grew up to be aloof until a boy from his class, Seong Ji-won befriends him. He later confesses his feelings to Ji-won and they start dating. He refrains from using any medicine or drugs during his imprisonment. He tragically relapses immediately after his release and is arrested again for drug abuse.

Dong-ho is a threat again to Je-Hyeok since he is transferred to Seobu Penitentiary and he attempts to murder Je-Hyeok. Je-Hyeok decides to keep him close and eventually becomes his "boss". Dong-ho helps him with his training as a catcher and remains fiercely loyal and protective of Je-Hyeok since he treats him with respect and dignity, unlike his other bosses.

Prison Guards:

Lieutenant Paeng is a compassionate corrections officer who wishes well for the prisoners, though he speaks in a disrespectful tone. He was once in a fire accident in a different jail and successfully saved all but one prisoner from his wing.

Lee Joon-Ho is Je-Hyeok's childhood friend. When Je-Hyeok and he were in an accident that also killed their coach, he gives up baseball despite his minor injuries, while Je-Hyeok rehabs from his major injuries. He also was a confounder to a major company, but quit before they became big. He admits that he constantly feels the need to move jobs. He is in a relationship with Kim Je-Hee, Je-Hyeok's sister.

Officer Song also works in the wing that holds Je-Hyeok's cell. He is fond of Captain Yoo since he saved his life when he choked on his food.

== Cast ==
=== Main ===
- Park Hae-soo as Kim Je-hyuk
  - Lee Tae-sun as young Kim Je-hyuk
- Jung Kyung-ho as Lee Joon-ho
  - Lee Do-hyun as young Lee Joon-ho

=== Supporting ===
==== People around Je-hyuk ====
- Krystal Jung as Kim Ji-ho
  - Shin Rin-ah as child Kim Ji-ho
  - Lee Chae-yoon as teenage Kim Ji-ho

Je-hyuk's girlfriend who is a traditional Korean medicine student.

- Lim Hwa-young as Kim Je-hee, Je-Hyeok's younger sister
- Ye Soo-jung as Je-hyuk's mother
- Kim Kyung-nam as Lee Joon-dol

Joon-ho's younger brother who is a reporter and an avid fan of Je-hyuk.

==== Seobu Detention Center ====
- Sung Dong-il as Chief Jo Ji-ho

A veteran chief prison guard who is quick and flexible when it comes to resolving incidents that take place inside the prison, but is known for being corrupt and easily swayed by money or other material goods that inmates can provide him.

- Jung Jae-sung as Professor Myung
- Lee Ho-chul as Gal Dae-bong (a.k.a. "Seagull")

==== Seobu Penitentiary ====
- Choi Moo-sung as Kim Min-chul (a.k.a. "Long-term Prisoner")
- Park Ho-san as Kang Chul-doo (a.k.a. "KAIST")
- Lee Kyu-hyung as Yoo Han-yang (a.k.a. "Second-generation Chaebol" or "Looney")
- Jung Hae-in as Yoo Jeong-woo (a.k.a. "Captain Yoo")
- Jung Min-sung as Go Park-sa (a.k.a. "Doctor Go")
- Kang Seung-yoon as
  - Lee Joo-hyung (a.k.a. "Jean Valjean")
  - Kang Seung-yoon as Lee Jong-won, Min-chul's fellow gang member who strongly resembles Joo-hyung. He, Min-chul and three others were found guilty of the murders of two rival gang members, but unlike Min-chul and two of their fellow co-accused, Jong-won (together with their gang leader) was sentenced to death and executed on 6 January 1996.
- Kim Sung-cheol as Kim Young-cheol (a.k.a. "Jailbird"), A man who frequently goes in and out of prison and the first person in the prison Je-hyuk befriends. Je-Hyeok pays for Young-cheol's mother's surgery. He is recruited by Je-Hyeok after his prison term.
- Ahn Chang-hwan as Dong-ho (a.k.a. "Croney")
- Jung Woong-in as Assistant Chief Paeng Se-yoon

=== Others ===
- Shin Jae-ha as Kim Min-sung

A friendly and bright prisoner who works in the prison's wood workshop with Je-hyuk and Park-sa. He was sentenced to prison after a fatal car accident.

- Lee Jung-hyuk as Nexen Team GM Asst
- Choi Sung-won as Jo Ki-cheol a.k.a. "Spot"

A prisoner who works in the prison's wood workshop with Je-hyuk, Park-sa, and Min-sung. He becomes the chief of operations in the workshop, replacing Yeom.

- Lee Hoon-jin as "Soji" (goods carrier)
- Joo Seok-tae as operations chief Yeom Sang-jae

The wood workshop's operations chief. He always takes the other workers' overtime pay for himself. He is sexually attracted to Je-hyuk.

- Ahn Sang-woo as Warden Kim Yong-chul

The prison's warden who is obsessed with the prison having a good reputation to the public, especially during Je-hyuk's imprisonment.

- Park Hyung-soo as Department Chief Na Hyung-soo

The strict prison guard who sticks to the rules

- Kim Han-jong as "Daehyungsoji" (heavy goods carrier)

Prisoner who is assigned as helper in section 2 of the prison. He loves the bright and lively atmosphere of Je-hyuk's cell.

- Kang Ki-doong as Prison Guard Song Gi-dong

A prison guard who is very talkative. He is drawn to Captain Yoo because he was once saved by him.

- Choi Yeon-dong as Vice Chief Lee Jung-jae
- Kim Ki-nam as Choi Hyun-woo (prisoner)
- Lee Do-gyeom as Park Do-gyeom (prison guard)
- Lim Cheol-hyung as Director Kim Hyuk-kwon
- Kong Sang-a as Kim Ji-ho's mother
- Park Hye-jin as Lee Joon-ho's mother
- Jung Jin
- Lee Moo-saeng as Captain Yoo's lawyer
- Kim Jae-geon
- Jang Hyuk-jin as Yoo Han-yang's father
- Yeom Hye-ran as Yoo Han-yang's mother
- Seo Ji-hoon as Min-sik
- Han Duk-soo as News anchor
- Kim Kyung-rae as News anchor
- Ki Eun-ryung as News anchor
- Lee Young-suk
- Yoo Hyung-kwan as Chief Shim Woo-kyung (prisoner)
- Park Young-soo
- Jang Joon-nyung as Baseball coach
- Bae Ho-geun as Jang Yoon-hwan
- Kim Yong-un as big prisoner
- Kim Tae-soo as Woodworking workshop inmate
- Lee Kyu-sung
- Choi Kwang-il
- Park Koo-yoon
- Kim Dong-chan
- Kwak Han-goo as a car thief
- Kim Jun-han as Song Ji-won

Boyfriend of Yoo Han-yang who wants Han-yang to stop using drugs

- Yang Dae-hyuk as Corporal Choi
- Choi Young
- Kang Hyun-jung
- Ko Young-bin as Doctor Jung Dae-hyun
- Ye In
- Jang Joon-ho
- Hong Seung-beom as Challenge Golden Bell MC
- Lee Kyu-seob
- Lee Sang-yi as Sergeant Oh Dong-hwan

The real murderer in Captain Yoo's case

- Ahn Tae-young as Lim Sun-soo
- Jung Moon-sung as Yoo Jung-min
- Shin Won-ho as Joo Jung-hoon
- Kim Mo-beom as Park Joon-young
- Jo Kyung-hoon
- Lee Do-yeop as Director Doh
- Tae Won-suk
- Park Kun-rak
- Song Young-hak
- Lee Shin-sung as CEO Nam
- Kim Jung-pal as Director Ji
- Lee Yoon-sang
- Yoo Su-bin as Yang Jung-suk
- Ji Min-hyuk as Kang Gun-woo
- Kim Ka-young
- Kwon Da-ham
- Son Kyung-won
- Shin Hee-kuk
- Jung Dong-hoon
- Seo Sang-won
- Kim Ki-moo as a rapist
- Lee Seok as Lee Suk-eun
- Kang Duk-jung
- Jung Kyung-cheol
- Lee Jae-woo
- Lee Do-kuk as Professor Kim Jin-sung
- Ko I-geon as a baseball teammate
- Son Kang-kuk as Taxi driver
- Bae-Jin-woong as Jin Woong
- Jo Joon
- Lee Ki-hyuk as Junior guard
- Sung Hyun-joon
- Ahn Ji-hyun as Ji-ho's friend
- Choi Myung-bin as Soo-bin, Chief Paeng's daughter

=== Special appearance ===
- Yoo Jae-myung as Je-hyuk's lawyer
- Kim Sun-young as Kang Chul-doo's ex-wife

== Production ==
- Prison Playbook is directed by Shin Won-ho, the award-winning director of Reply anthology series, and written by one of the series' junior writers, Jung Bo-hoon.
- The first script reading of the cast was held on July 17, 2017, at CJ E&M Center in Sangam-dong, Seoul.
- The filming wrapped up on January 16, 2018.

== Original soundtrack ==
Prison Playbook Original Soundtrack

Soundtrack album by Various Artists
- Genre: Soundtrack
- Languages: Korean, English
- Labels: CJ E&M; Koong Entertainment
- Producer: Kim Han-jo (executive)

=== Part 1 ===
No.	Title	Lyrics	Music	Artist	Length
1.	"OK"	Bewhy	Gray, DAX, Bewhy	Bewhy	03:12
2.	"OK" (Inst.)		Gray, DAX, Bewhy		03:12
Total length:					06:24

=== Part 2 ===
No.	Title	Lyrics	Music	Artist	Length
1.	"The Door (Prod. By Zico)" (문)	Mino, Zico	Zico, Poptime	Kang Seung-yoon, Mino (Winner)	03:21
2.	"The Door (Prod. By Zico)" (Inst.)		Zico, Poptime		03:21
Total length:					06:42

=== Part 3 ===
No.	Title	Lyrics	Music	Artist	Length
1.	"Like A Dream" (꿈만 같아)	DGG	DGG	Park Bo-ram	03:02
2.	"Like A Dream" (Inst.)		DGG		03:02
Total length:					06:04

=== Part 4 ===
No.	Title	Lyrics	Music	Artist	Length
1.	"Bravo, My Life!"	Jong-jin Kim	Jong-jin Kim	Eric Nam	04:05
2.	"Bravo, My Life!" (Inst.)		Jong-jin Kim		04:05
Total length:					08:10

=== Part 5 ===
No.	Title	Lyrics	Music	Artist	Length
1.	"Would Be Better" (좋았을걸)	Heize	Heize, DAVII	Heize	03:40
2.	"Would Be Better" (Inst.)		Heize, DAVII		03:40
Total length:					07:20

=== Part 6 ===
No.	Title	Lyrics	Music	Artist	Length
1.	"Nostalgia (Prod. by Woogie)" (향수)	Woo Won-jae	Woogie	Woo Won-jae	03:21
2.	"Nostalgia (Prod. by Woogie)" (Inst.)		Woogie		03:21
Total length:					06:42

=== Part 7 ===
No.	Title	Lyrics	Music	Artist	Length
1.	"No Problem" (괜찮아)	Shim Jae-hee, Primeboi	Primeboi	CNU, Baro (B1A4)	03:33
2.	"No Problem" (Inst.)		Primeboi		03:33
Total length:					07:06

=== Part 8 ===
No.	Title	Lyrics	Music	Artist	Length
1.	"That's The Way It Goes (ft. Kim Min-jae (REAL.BE))" (다이런거지뭐)	DAVII	DAVII	DAVII	03:49
2.	"That's The Way It Goes" (Inst.)		DAVII		03:49
Total length:					07:38

=== Part 9 ===
No.	Title	Lyrics	Music	Artist	Length
1.	"Those Days (Without You)" (하루일과)	Zion.T	Zion.T, Slom, Peejay	Zion.T	03:05
2.	"Those Days (Without You)" (Inst.)		Zion.T, Slom, Peejay		03:05
Total length:					06:10

=== Part 10 ===
No.	Title	Lyrics	Music	Artist	Length
1.	"How Strange" (희한하네)	Rhythm Power	Topic Of Changan	Rhythm Power	03:23
2.	"How Strange" (Inst.)		Topic Of Changan		03:23
Total length:					06:46

=== Commercial performance ===
Chart performance

Title	Year	Peak	Sales	Remarks
Title	Year	Gaon	Sales	Remarks
"The Door" (문)	2017	—	KOR: 18,521+	Part 2
"Would Be Better" (좋았을걸)	2017	22	KOR: 122,393+	Part 5
"Nostalgia" (향수)	2017	93	KOR: 20,066+	Part 6
"—" denotes releases that did not chart or were not released in that region.

== Viewership ==
Prison Playbook : South Korea viewers per episode (millions)

Season	Episode number															
Season	1	2	3	4	5	6	7	8	9	10	11	12	13	14	15	16
1	N/A	N/A	N/A	N/A	N/A	N/A	N/A	N/A	N/A	N/A	2.324	2.469	2.713	2.880	2.877	3.063

Source: Audience measurement performed nationwide by Nielsen Korea. (Note: The number of viewers was released on Nielsen Korea starting January 2018.)

Average TV viewership ratings
Ep.	Original broadcast date	Average audience share		
Ep.	Original broadcast date	Nielsen Korea		TNmS
Ep.	Original broadcast date	Nationwide	Seoul	Nationwide
1	November 22, 2017	4.638%	4.816%	5.1%
2	November 23, 2017	5.381%	5.900%	5.1%
3	November 29, 2017	4.698%	5.336%	4.9%
4	November 30, 2017	5.468%	6.644%	5.3%
5	December 6, 2017	5.612%	6.518%	5.7%
6	December 7, 2017	5.847%	6.260%	6.2%
7	December 13, 2017	6.388%	6.942%	7.1%
8	December 14, 2017	6.774%	7.409%	7.0%
9	December 20, 2017	7.313%	8.376%	7.4%
10	December 21, 2017	7.910%	8.809%	7.7%
11	January 3, 2018	9.095%	10.139%	8.7%
12	January 4, 2018	9.393%	10.511%	9.6%
13	January 10, 2018	10.142%	11.077%	10.2%
14	January 11, 2018	10.615%	11.531%	11.3%
15	January 17, 2018	10.477%	11.620%	10.9%
16	January 18, 2018	11.195%	12.299%	10.9%
Average		7.559%	8.387%	7.7%
Special	December 27, 2017	5.110%	5.658%	5.3%
In the table above, the blue numbers represent the lowest ratings and the red numbers represent the highest ratings.; This series aired on a cable channel/pay TV which normally has a relatively smaller audience compared to free-to-air TV/public broadcasters (KBS, SBS, MBC and EBS).

== Awards and nominations ==
Year	Award	Category	Recipient	Result	Ref.
2018	22nd Asian Television Awards	Best Drama Series	Prison Playbook	Nominated	
2018	12th Korean Cable TV Awards	Best Drama	Prison Playbook	Won	
2018	54th Baeksang Arts Awards	Best Director	Shin Won-ho	Nominated	
2018	54th Baeksang Arts Awards	Best Supporting Actor	Park Ho-san	Won	
2018	54th Baeksang Arts Awards	Best New Actor	Park Hae-soo	Nominated	
2018	54th Baeksang Arts Awards	Best Screenplay	Jung Bo-hoon	Nominated	
2018	54th Baeksang Arts Awards	Most Popular Actor	Jung Hae-in	Won	
2018	6th APAN Star Awards	Excellence Award, Actor in a Miniseries	Park Hae-soo	Nominated	
2018	6th APAN Star Awards	Best Supporting Actor	Park Ho-san	Won	
2018	2nd The Seoul Awards	Best Supporting Actor	Park Ho-san	Nominated	
2018	2nd The Seoul Awards	Best New Actor	Park Hae-soo	Won	
