= Reply (TV series) =

South Korean anthology television series

- Hangul: 응답하라
- Hanja: 應答하라
- Lit.: Answer Me
- RR: Eungdaphara
- MR: Ŭngdaphara
- Genre: Coming-of-age; Comedy; Romance; Family drama
- Written by: Lee Woo-jung (season 1–3); Lee Sun-hye (season 1); Kim Ran-joo (season 1)
- Directed by: Shin Won-ho
- Starring: See below
- Country of origin: South Korea
- Original language: Korean
- No. of seasons: 3
- No. of episodes: 57 + 3 special

Production
- Production companies: CJ E&M; tvN

Original release
- Network: tvN
- Release: July 24, 2012 – January 16, 2016

Reply (Korean: 응답하라) is a South Korean anthology television series directed by Shin Won-ho with teleplay by Lee Woo-jung that premiered in 2012 on cable network tvN. It revolves around a group of friends, as the timeline moves back and forth between their past and present selves.

The series received acclaim from critics for its performances, direction, screenplay and soundtrack in addition to being a well-researched production. It has also recorded consistent high audience ratings with Reply 1988 peaking at 18.8% nationwide, making it the highest rated drama in Korean cable television history at the time of airing.

== Series overview ==
=== I. Reply 1997 ===
Set in 1997, the drama centers around a female high school student Shi-won, who idolizes boyband H.O.T. and her 5 high school friends in Busan. As the timeline moves back and forth between their past as 18-year-old high schoolers in 1997 and their present as 33-year-olds at their high school reunion dinner in 2012, one couple will announce that they're getting married.

=== II. Reply 1994 ===
Set in 1994, six university students from various provincial areas live together at a boarding house in Sinchon, Seoul, run by a couple with a daughter named Na-jung. The timeline moves back and forth between the past in 1994 and the present in 2013, making the viewers guess who will become Na-jung's husband among the male characters. The series follows the pop culture events that happened between 1994 and the years that follow, including the emergence of seminal K-pop group Seo Taiji and Boys and the Korean Basketball League.

=== III. Reply 1988 ===
Set in the year 1988, it revolves around five friends and their families living in the same neighborhood of Ssangmun-dong, Dobong District, Northern Seoul.

== Cast ==
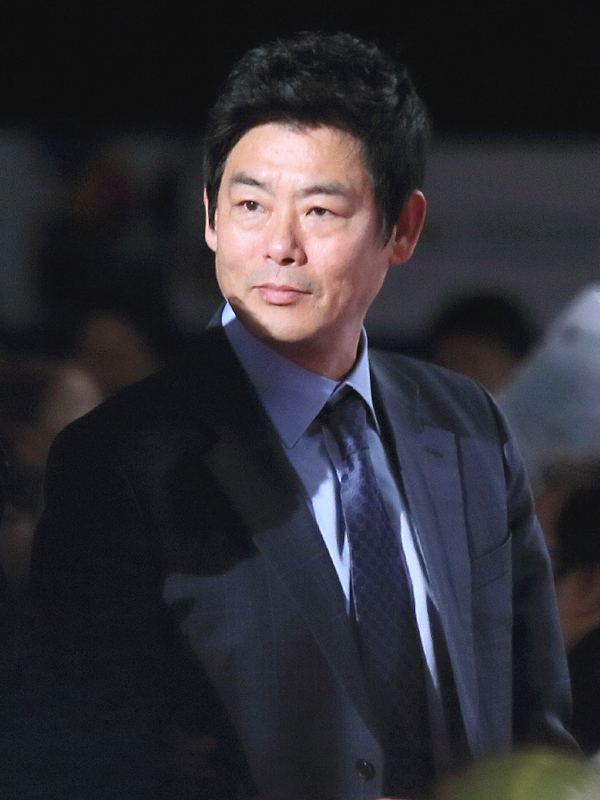
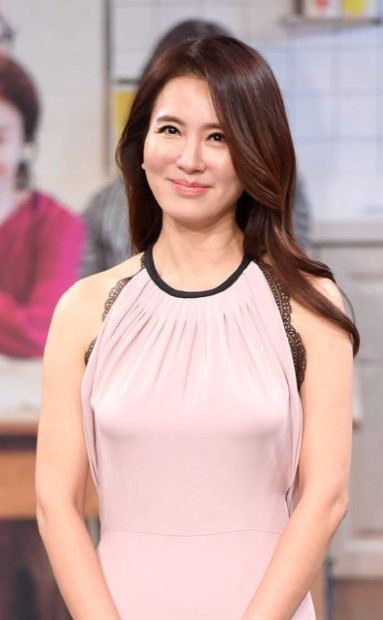
Actors Sung Dong-il and Lee Il-hwa play the parents of the female lead character in each series
Reply 1997 leads

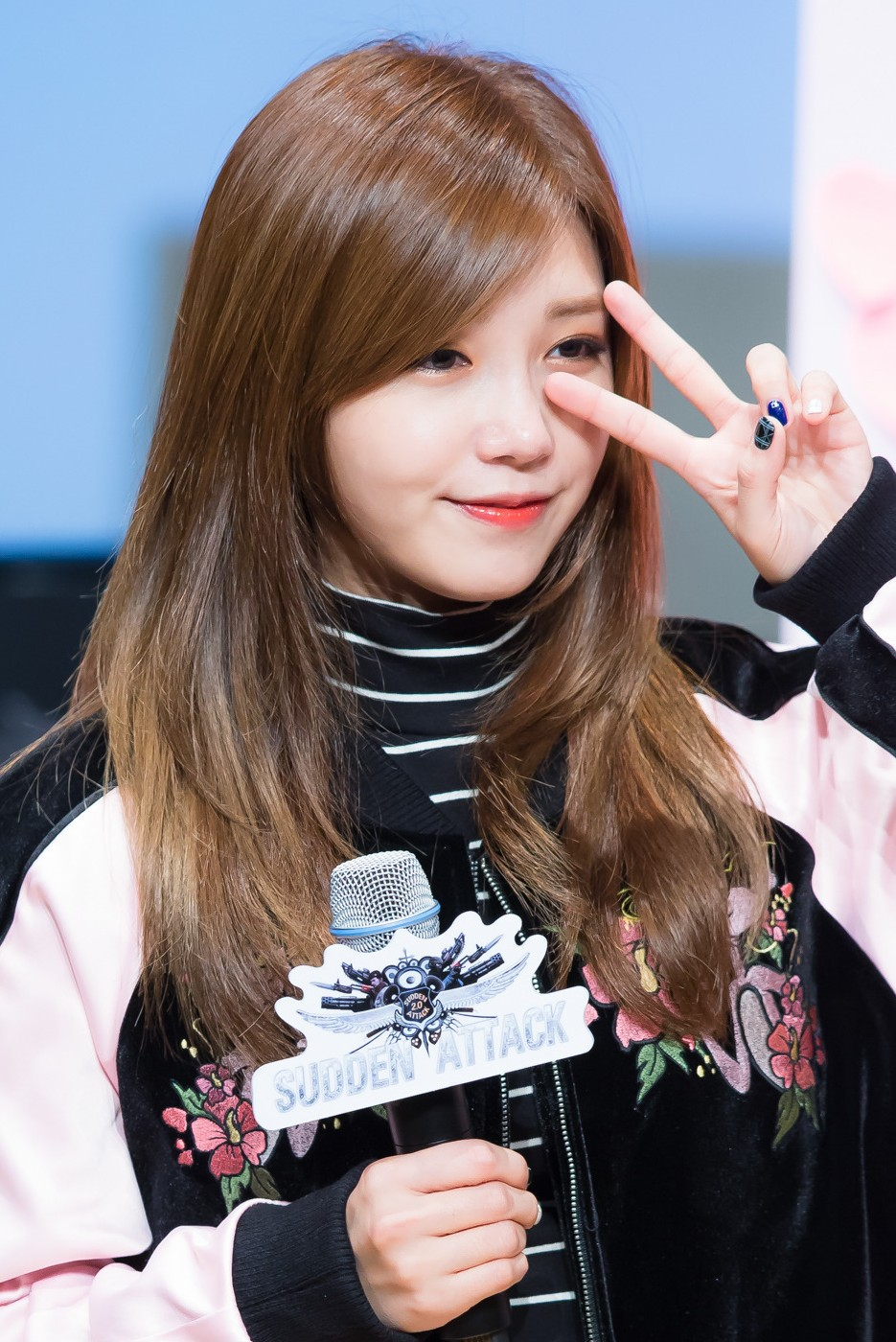
Jung Eun-ji

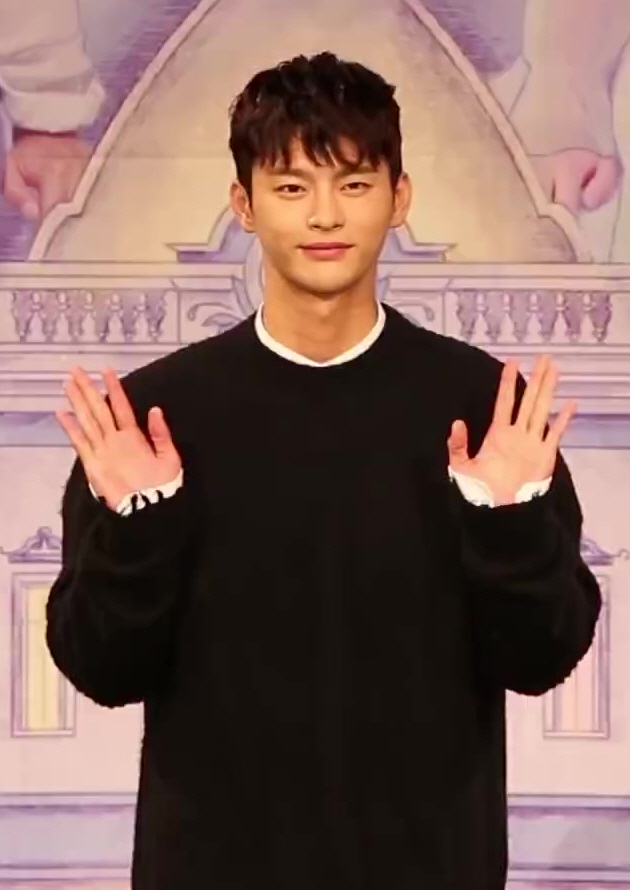
Seo In-guk

Reply 1994 leads

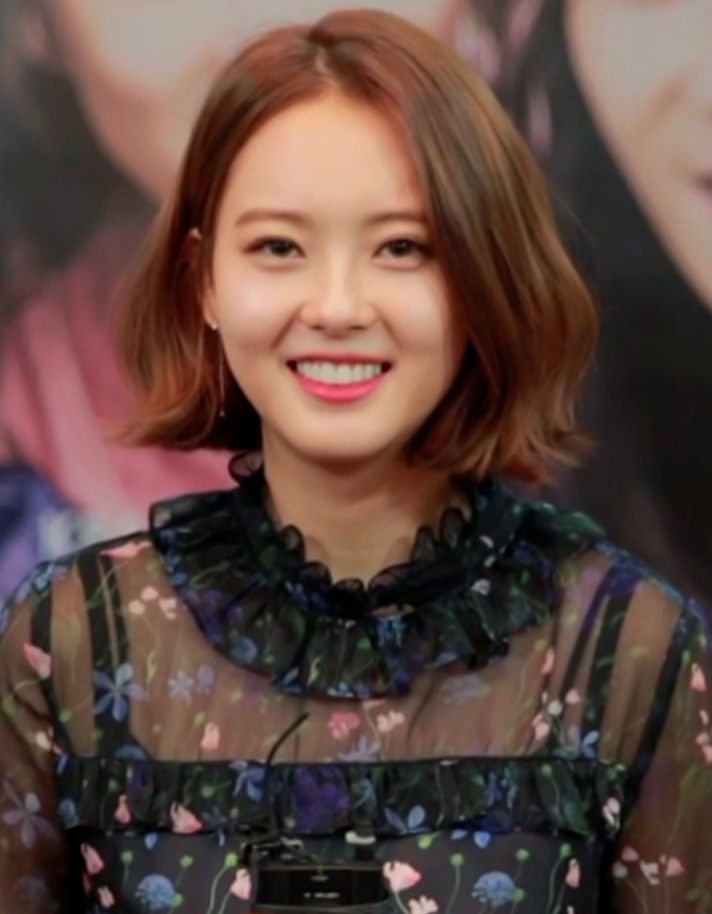
Go Ara

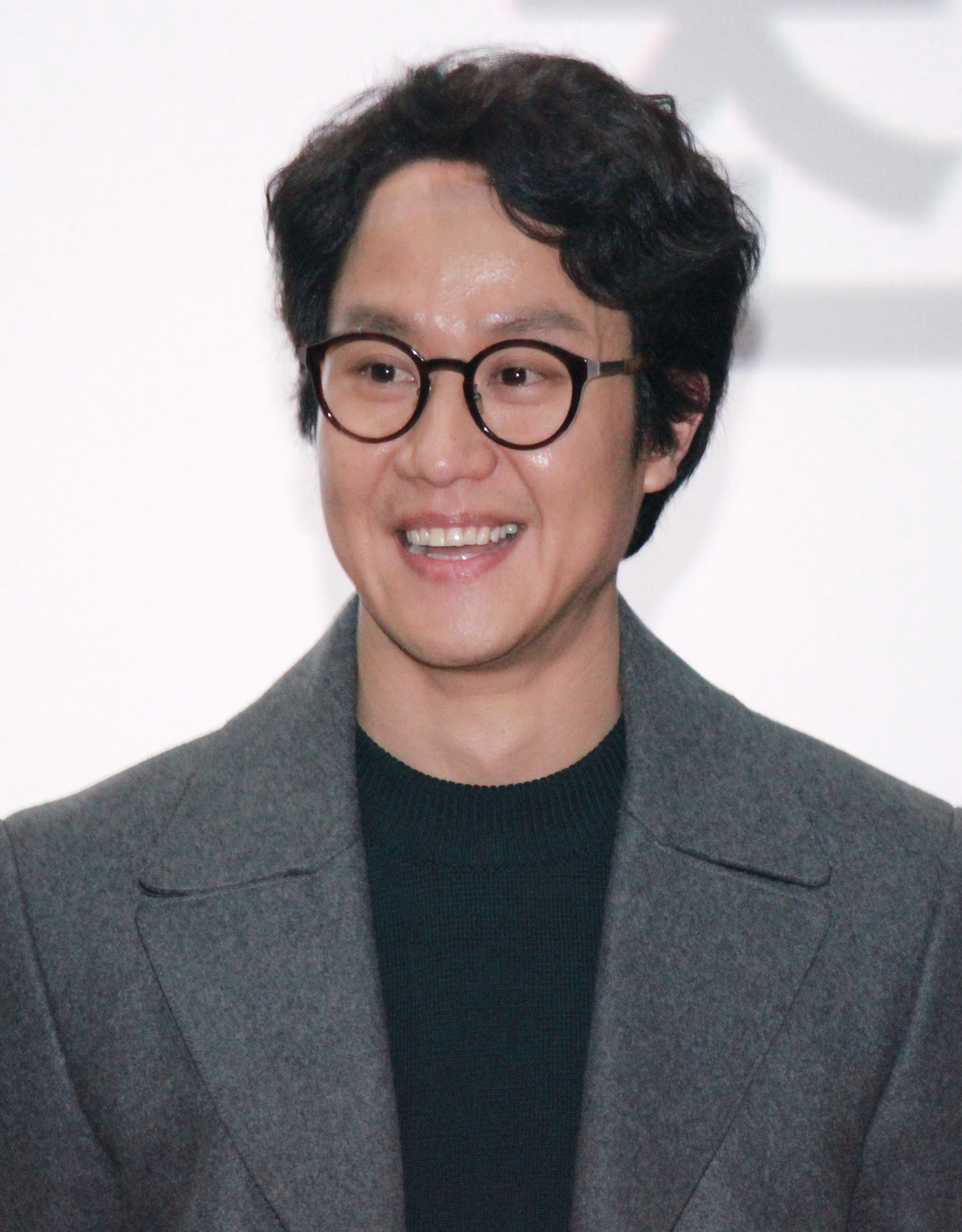
Jung Woo

Reply 1988 leads

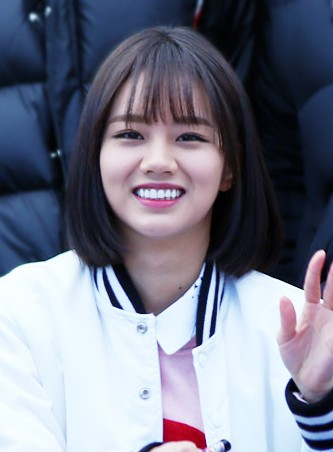
Lee Hye-ri

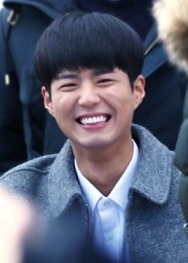
Park Bo-gum

Actor			
Actor	Reply 1997	Reply 1994	Reply 1988
Principal
Jung Eun-ji	check	^{1}	
Seo In-guk	check	^{1}	
Hoya	check	^{1}	
Shin So-yul	check	^{1}	
Eun Ji-won	check	^{1}	
Lee Si-eon	check	^{1}	
Go Ara		check	^{1}
Jung Woo		check	^{1}
Yoo Yeon-seok		check	
Kim Sung-kyun		check	^{2}
Son Ho-jun		check	
Baro		check	
Min Do-hee		check	
Lee Hye-ri			check
Park Bo-gum			check
Go Kyung-pyo			check
Ryu Jun-yeol			check
Lee Dong-hwi			check
Sung Dong-il	check	check	check
Lee Il-hwa	check	check	check
Song Jong-ho	check		
Noh Ji-yeon	check		
Jung Kyung-mi	check		
Kim Sun-ah	check		
Yook Sung-jae		check	
Shin Soo-yeon		check	
Yoon Jong-hoon		check	
Yeon Joon-seok		check	
Ryu Hye-young			check
Choi Sung-won			check
Ra Mi-ran			check
Ahn Jae-hong			check
Kim Sun-young			check
Kim Seol			check
Choi Moo-sung			check
Yoo Jae-myung			check
Lee Min-ji			check
Lee Se-young			check
Song Young-kyu			check
Lee Mi-yeon			check
Kim Joo-hyuk			check
Jeon Mi-seon			check
Woo Hyun			^{1}
Yong Young-jae			check
Bae Yoo-ram			check

Notes

- ^{1} Cameo appearance only.
- ^{2} Supporting character.

== Episodes ==
	Episodes	Originally Released	
	Episodes	First released	Last released
Reply 1997	16 + 1 special	July 24, 2012	September 18, 2012
Reply 1994	21	October 18, 2013	December 28, 2013
Reply 1988	20 + 2 specials	November 6, 2015	January 16, 2016

== Viewership ratings ==
	Average Audience Share (Nationwide)			Source
	Lowest	Highest	Average	Source
Reply 1997	1.00%	7.55%	2.83%	TNmS
Reply 1994	2.264%	11.509%	7.128%	AGB Nielsen
Reply 1988	6.118%	18.803%	12.314%	AGB Nielsen
