= Reply 1997 =

2012 South Korean television series

- Promotional poster
- Also known as: Answer Me 1997
- Genre: Romance; Comedy; Teen; Drama
- Created by: Shin Won-ho; Lee Myung-han
- Written by: Lee Woo-jung; Lee Sun-hye; Kim Ran-ju
- Directed by: Shin Won-ho
- Starring: Jung Eun-ji; Seo In-guk; Hoya; Eun Ji-won; Shin So-yul; Lee Si-eon; Sung Dong-il; Lee Il-hwa
- Composer: Kim Han-jo
- Country of origin: South Korea
- Original language: Korean
- No. of episodes: 16

Production
- Cinematography: Oh Jae-ho; Bae Young-soo
- Running time: 30–60 minutes
- Production company: tvN

Original release
- Network: tvN
- Release: July 24 – September 18, 2012

Related
- Reply 1994; Reply 1988

Reply 1997 (Korean: 응답하라 1997; RR: Eungdaphara 1997) is a 2012 South Korean television series and the first installment of the Reply anthology series. It centers on the lives of six friends in Busan as the timeline moves back and forth between their past selves as 18-year-old high schoolers in 1997 and their present selves as 33-year-olds at their high school reunion dinner in 2012 where one couple will announce that they're getting married. It portrays the extreme fan culture that emerged in the 1990s when first generation idol groups such as H.O.T. and Sechs Kies took center stage and K-pop was just beginning to blossom.

The series was one of the highest-rated Korean dramas in cable television history. It garnered praise from audiences and critics for being well-researched and full of humor and heart.

== Synopsis ==
Set in 1997, the series follows female high school student Sung Shi-won (Jung Eun-ji), who idolizes boyband H.O.T, and the lives of her five high school friends. As a teen, Shi-won was obsessed with a boy band. Now 33 years old, Shi-won and her friends are reliving their memories at their high school reunion.

== Cast ==
=== Main ===
- Jung Eun-ji as Sung Shi-won

A devoted fangirl of boyband H.O.T., who dreams of marrying Tony. Though Shi-won has the worst grades in her class and always has her head in the clouds, she is also forthright and sassy.

- Seo In-guk as Yoon Yoon-jae

Quiet and brooding yet devoted to those close to him, Yoon-jae is Shi-won's childhood best friend who frequently spends time at her house following the death of his own parents. He is also known as one of the two most handsome boys in the school, alongside Joon-hee, and girls often fall for the both of them. He is intelligent and at the top of his class. As a teenager, Yoon-jae falls for Shi-won, and tries to keep it a secret.

- Hoya as Kang Joon-hee

Joon-hee is shy and sweet, and is Yoon-jae's best friend and right-hand man. Like Yoon-jae, girls fall for him easily, and he often spends time with Shi-won. He harbors the secret that he is gay and is in love with his best friend Yoon-jae, which only Shi-won is aware of after he confides in her.

- Shin So-yul as Mo Yoo-jung

Shi-won's best friend, despite the occasional argument following the revelation that Yoo-jung is a fan of Sechs Kies, a rival boy band. Yoo-jung is known to be very fickle when it comes to love, falling for boys - whether in real life or in the celebrity world - at the drop of a hat.

- Eun Ji-won as Do Hak-chan

A transfer student from Seoul. Hak-chan loves sports and has a comically large pornography collection. He is outgoing around his friends, yet his major weakness is his inability to interact with girls - however, he eventually falls for Yoo-jung.

- Lee Si-eon as Bang Sung-jae

The mile-a-minute talker and one-man rumor mill of the group.

- Sung Dong-il as Sung Dong-il
  - Kang Kyun-sung as young Dong-il in 1968 (ep. 9)

Shi-won's father and a baseball coach of the Busan Seagulls.

- Lee Il-hwa as Lee Il-hwa
  - Park Cho-rong as young Lee Il-hwa in 1968 (ep. 9)

Shi-won's mother and a housewife.

- Song Jong-ho as Yoon Tae-woong

A teacher at the high school. Tae-woong turns out to be Yoon-jae's older brother, and had previously been engaged to Shi-won's late elder sister prior to her death. However, over the course of the show, Tae-woong also falls for Shi-won.

=== Supporting ===
- Noh Ji-yeon as Jang Dan-ji - Moon Hee-joon fangirl
- Jung Kyung-mi as Kyung-mi / "Eun Dokki" (Eun Axe) - Sechs Kies fangirl, a bully at the school who believes Eun Ji-won has chosen her, and who is in love with Yoon-jae and Joon-hee, and clashes with Shi-won on the subject, while vying for both boys' attention.
- Kim Sun-ah as Kim Sun-ah / "Eun Gak-ha" - Sechs Kies fangirl, the accomplice of Kyung-mi, who also is in love with Yoon-jae and Joon-hee.

=== Special appearances ===
- Tony Ahn as himself (ep. 1, 3, 6)
- Kim Gook-jin as himself (ep. 1)
- Kim Ye-won as Sung Song-joo (ep. 3, 4, 9), Shi-won's older sister who died in a bus accident prior to the events of the series
- Moon Hee-joon as himself (voice) (ep. 3)
- Im Si-wan as ROTC chatmate (ep. 4)
- Lee Yoon-seok as Gyu-gaeng, bungeoppang vendor (ep. 5)
- Kim Jong-min as driver in car accident (ep. 5)
- Shin Bong-sun as Busan H.O.T. fanclub president (ep. 6)
- Jung Joo-ri as noraebang customer (ep. 8)
- Jung Myung-ok as noraebang customer (ep. 8)
- Kim Tae-won as noraebang customer (ep. 8)
- Choo Min-ki as Choo Shin-soo (ep. 8)
- Ryu Dam as Lee Dae-ho (ep. 8)
- Yang Joon-hyuk as Yoon Joon-hyuk, Yoon-jae's father (ep. 9)
  - Son Jin-young as young Joon-hyuk in 1968 (ep. 9)
- Lee Yeon-kyung as Moon Jung-mi, Yoon-jae's mother (ep. 9)
  - Yoon Bo-mi as young Moon Jung-mi in 1968 (ep. 9)
- Kim Ki-wook as cellphone store salesman (ep. 9)
- Park Ji-yoon as Joon-hee's sixth older sister at noraebang (ep. 8) / seventh older sister at pojangmacha (ep. 10)
- Yoon Hyung-bin as Eun Gak-ha's husband (ep. 9, 10)
- Yang Se-hyung as Eun Dokki's husband (ep. 9, 10)
- Ahn Young-mi as Sechs Kies fanclub president (ep. 10)
- Kang Yu-mi as H.O.T. fanclub president (ep. 10)
- Kim Dae-ju as PD with megaphone (ep. 10)
- Shin Dong-yup as MC of the 1998 Golden Disk Awards (voice) (ep. 10)
- Lee Joo-yeon as Doctor Lee Joo-won (ep. 14, 16)
- Lee Sol-ji as TV show host (ep. 15)
- Go In-bum as Dong-il's uncle (ep. 15)
- G.NA as blind date (ep. 15)
- Bae Da-hae as Yoon-jae's colleague and drinking buddy (ep. 16)

== Production ==
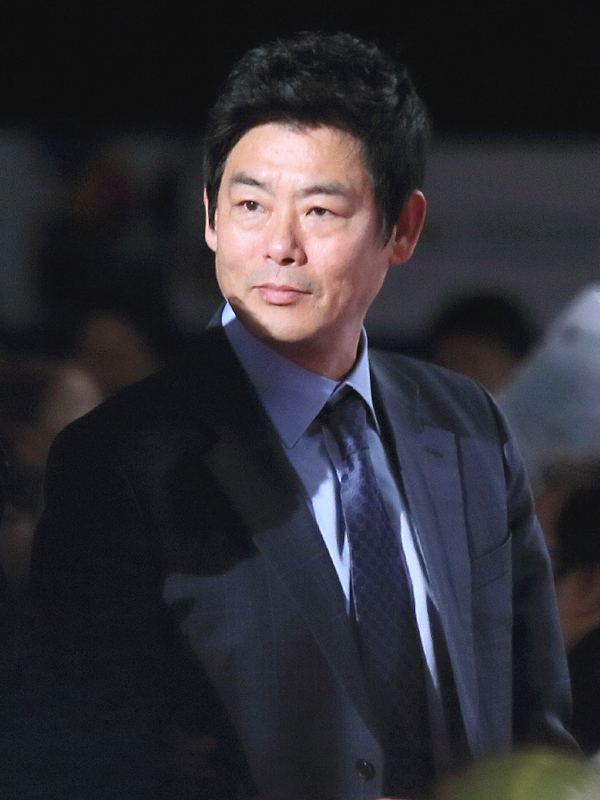
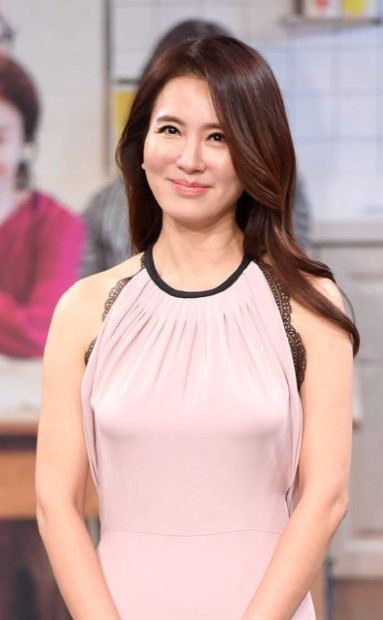
Actors Sung Dong-il and Lee Il-hwa play the parents of the female lead character in each installment of the Reply anthology series

The series originally aired live on cable channel tvN with 16 episodes (fourteen 30-minute episodes aired back-to-back over a period of 7 weeks, with the last 2 episodes aired separately and lasting 1 hour each due to the amount of material the staff didn't want to edit out). However, due to its popularity, the 15th and 16th episodes were also aired simultaneously on Mnet, OCN, O'live, Ongamenet and OnStyle. This drama served as the acting debut of Jung Eun-ji.

== Soundtrack ==
The '90s-set drama didn't have an original soundtrack of its own since a huge aspect of the show's mood is set with era-specific music, one of its defining characteristics. Instead, lead actors Jung Eun-ji and Seo In-guk recorded a 2-part mini OST entitled Love Story to thank fans and viewers of the show. Seo was the first season winner of the music audition program Superstar K, and Eun-ji is the main vocalist of K-pop girl group A Pink. Their duet in Part 1 was a remake of 1990s idol group Cool's "All For You." Their duet in Part 2 is a remake of "Just the Way We Love", from the soundtrack of 1999 film Love Wind Love Song.

The two singles topped the Gaon Single Chart and Billboard's K-Pop Hot 100, and "All For You" became one of the best-selling singles of that year with 2,499,273 downloads. Jung and Seo also gave a live performance on Mnet's M! Countdown on 6 September 2012, and on 19 September, the song "All For You" ranked first on another music program, Music Triangle.

Due to popular demand, CJ E&M eventually released a "Director's Edition" soundtrack that feature Jung and Seo's 2 covers, as well as '90s songs played throughout the series. It also included a mini photobook and a behind-the-scenes DVD. Before its official release, the album sold out its 12,500 units via pre-order, surpassing the average soundtrack sales figure of 5,000.

Album information	Track listing
Reply 1997 Director's Edition OST: Released: 28 September 2012; Label: CJ E&M	Track listing: 1. All For You - Seo In-guk and Jung Eun-ji; 2. 우리 사랑 이대로 (Just the Way We Love) - Seo In-guk and Jung Eun-ji; 3. 고백 (Confession) - Deli Spice; 4. 슬픈 우리 젊은 날 (Our Sad Younger Days) - UNO; 5. 애송이의 사랑 (Young Love) - Yangpa; 6. 슬프도록 아름다운 (The Sadder, the More Beautiful) - K2; 7. 바램 (Wish) - Toy; 8. 사랑하는 너에게 (To You, the One I Love) - Sechs Kies; 9. Pilot - Jung Yeon-joon; 10. 눈물 (Tears) - Riaa; 11. 왜 하늘은... (Why the Heavens...) - Lee Ji-hoon; 12. 커플 (Couple) - Sechs Kies; 13. To Heaven - Jo Sung-mo; 14. 루비 (Ruby) - Fin.K.L; 15. 메모리즈 (Memories) - Sa Joon

== Reception and impact ==
The TV series primarily featured idol singers with limited acting experience. Aside from the casting of Sechs Kies member Eun Ji-won who previously worked with director Shin Won-ho and the writing staff on 2 Days & 1 Night, the series received relatively little attention before its premiere. Following its release, it gained recognition through word of mouth and developed a substantial following.

With Korean cable shows generally considered successful if they hit 1%, Reply 1997 took cable ratings by storm, and received an immense amount of attention and critical praise. The show has been credited for its laser-sharp attention to detail, re-creating the late '90s with an accuracy that had fans singing its praises. Endless pop culture references are packed into every minute of the show, with little pop culture easter eggs hidden in scenes, callbacks to the trends of the day, and cameos that are in-jokes.

It was also a digital success, receiving more than a million hits after it was made available for downloading and streaming on internet and mobile site Tving. This was attributed to the fact that Reply 1997 had aired on a cable network (pay television channel), such that several viewers were unable to watch it live.

With the majority of Korean dramas shot in the capital city of Seoul, another of the show's charms is its Busan setting, which is treated in a matter-of-fact way as a locale. The realism is aided by the fact that much of the principal cast actually hails from the region, who speak with the authentic Gyeongsang dialect. The dialogue also uses time-specific, location-specific slang.

But '90s nostalgia and meticulous attention to detail is only part of the show's appeal. Fans were also intrigued by the clues that the 2012 scenes dropped at regular intervals about who ends up together, as well as the episodes' subtle twists. And its smart, witty way of addressing the growing pains of its adolescent cast makes it just as relevant in the present as it was back in the late-'90s setting of its primary plot. Audiences have lauded the show's intimacy and realism, with a sincerity that connects with people — even those outside that particular generation.

Seo In-guk, Eun Ji-won, Lee Si-eon and Shin So-yul hosted the 15 September 2012 episode of sketch comedy show Saturday Night Live Korea, which included skits that parody scenes in their series. On 20 September 2012, a special was aired on tvN's enews featuring behind-the-scenes videos and a few bloopers from the set.

A novelization was published in January 2013. Director Shin Won-ho re-edited all 16 episodes for a special director's cut DVD, released in February 2013. It also included 358 minutes of exclusive behind-the-scenes footage, a blooper reel, as well as commentary from the director and actors.

The show was said to have sparked the "retro" trend in South Korea and the media and cultural commentators have noted an increased interest in the pop culture of the 1990s after the show aired. Notably, the show garnered more interest in "first generation" K-pop idol groups whose heyday took place during the 1990s prior to the Korean Wave, hence not being as well known to international audiences as their much younger counterparts. Not long after the show concluded, Eun and H.O.T members Moon Hee-joon and Tony An joined two other members of fellow first-generation groups in filming their own variety show Handsome Boys of the 20th Century, which Moon called the "reality-variety show version of Reply 1997". In 2014, the highly successful comebacks of Seo Taiji, g.o.d and Fly to the Sky further added to the retro wave. The variety show Infinite Challenge began airing the "Saturday, Saturday is for Singers" (ToToGa) segment which specifically features artists and groups popular during the 1990s and has directly led to the reunions of first-generation groups Jinusean, S.E.S, Sechs Kies and H.O.T after over a decade of inactivity or disbandment.

Director Shin Won-ho and writers Lee Woo-jung, Lee Sun-hye, and Kim Ran-ju had all previously worked in variety television and had no prior experience directing or writing for a drama series. Rather than following conventional drama production practices, they structured each scene using a variety-show planning approach, and applied editing techniques characteristic of variety programming—designed to build suspense and curiosity—rather than the straightforward chronological editing typical of dramas, a method credited with heightening audience engagement.

== Ratings ==
Ep.	Original broadcast date	Title	Average audience share (TNmS)
Ep.	Original broadcast date	Title	Nationwide
1	July 24, 2012	Eighteen	1.20%
2	July 24, 2012	Becoming More and More Different	1.20%
3	July 31, 2012	What You See Is Not Everything	1.20%
4	July 31, 2012	Fair Play	1.20%
5	August 7, 2012	Life's Counterattack	1.00%
6	August 7, 2012	Love Makes You Do Things You Didn't Do Before	1.00%
7	August 14, 2012	Future Hopes	3.25%
8	August 14, 2012	D-Day	3.25%
9	August 21, 2012	The Thread of Fate	3.00%
10	August 21, 2012	The Reason Why I Like You	3.00%
11	August 28, 2012	The Definition of Relationships	3.46%
12	August 28, 2012	The Meaning of a Hand	3.46%
13	September 4, 2012	Next Time... No, Now	3.70%
14	September 4, 2012	The Heart Is What Makes You Love	3.70%
15	September 11, 2012	While You Were Loving	4.17%
16	September 18, 2012	Why First Loves Don't Work Out	7.55%
Average			2.83%
In the table above, the blue numbers represent the lowest ratings and the red numbers represent the highest ratings.; This drama airs on a cable channel/pay TV which normally has a relatively smaller audience compared to free-to-air TV/public broadcasters (KBS, SBS, MBC and EBS).

== Awards and nominations ==
Year	Award	Category	Recipient	Result	Ref
2012	5th Style Icon Awards	Top 10 Style Icons	Seo In-guk and Jung Eun-ji	Won	
2012	5th Korea Drama Awards	Best Couple Award	Seo In-guk and Jung Eun-ji	Won	
2012	14th Mnet Asian Music Awards	Best OST	"All For You" – Seo In-guk and Jung Eun-ji	Won	
2012	1st K-Drama Star Awards	Acting Award, Actress	Jung Eun-ji	Nominated	
2012	1st K-Drama Star Awards	Rising Star Award	Seo In-guk	Won	
2012	1st K-Drama Star Awards	Rising Star Award	Jung Eun-ji	Won	
2012	1st K-Drama Star Awards	Best OST	"All For You" – Seo In-guk and Jung Eun-ji	Won	
2012	1st K-Drama Star Awards	Best Couple Award	Seo In-guk and Jung Eun-ji	Won	
2012	4th Melon Music Awards	Best OST	"All For You" – Seo In-guk and Jung Eun-ji	Won	
2013	7th Cable TV Broadcasting Awards	Grand Prize (Daesang)	Reply 1997	Won	
2013	49th Baeksang Arts Awards	Best New Actor (TV)	Seo In-guk	Nominated	
2013	49th Baeksang Arts Awards	Best New Actress (TV)	Jung Eun-ji	Won	
2013	49th Baeksang Arts Awards	Best Screenplay (TV)	Lee Woo-jung	Nominated	
2013	8th Seoul International Drama Awards	Best Series Drama	Reply 1997	Nominated	
2016	tvN10 Awards	Best Actor	Sung Dong-il	Nominated	
2016	tvN10 Awards	Special Acting Award	Sung Dong-il	Won	
2016	tvN10 Awards	Best Content Award, Drama	Reply 1997	Won	
2016	tvN10 Awards	Made in tvN, Actor in Drama	Seo In-guk	Won	
2016	tvN10 Awards	Made in tvN, Actress in Drama	Jung Eun-ji	Nominated	
2016	tvN10 Awards	Scene-Stealer Award, Actress	Lee Il-hwa	Nominated	
2016	tvN10 Awards	Best Kiss Award	Seo In-guk and Jung Eun-ji	Won	

== Spin-offs ==
Another series from the same writer and director, Reply 1994 was produced in 2013. Set in a college campus, it follows the pop culture events of that year, including the emergence of seminal K-pop group Seo Taiji and Boys and the basketball craze of the era. It also starred Sung Dong-il and Lee Il-hwa, but as different characters. Younger cast members Jung Eun-ji, Seo In-guk, Hoya, Lee Si-eon, Shin So-yul, Eun Ji-won, and Lee Jooyeon reprised their Reply 1997 roles in cameo appearances.

A second spin-off, Reply 1988, aired in 2015. Sung Dong-il and Lee Il-hwa again joined the cast.

== Remake ==
An American remake, Answer Me 1999 was reportedly in development in 2014 at Fox, written by Amy Andelson and Emily Meyer (Step Up 3D), with the pilot episode directed by Jon M. Chu.
