= Reply 1988 =

2015–2016 South Korean television series

- Promotional poster
- Also known as: Answer Me 1988
- Hangul: 응답하라 1988
- Hanja: 應答하라 1988
- RR: Eungdaphara 1988
- MR: Ŭngdaphara 1988
- Genre: Slice-of-life; Family drama; Coming-of-age
- Written by: Lee Woo-jung
- Directed by: Shin Won-ho
- Starring: See full list below
- Theme music composer: Shin Hae-chul
- Opening theme: "To You" (그대에게)
- Country of origin: South Korea
- Original language: Korean
- No. of episodes: 20 + special

Production
- Producer: Lee Myung-han
- Running time: 90–110 minutes
- Production company: tvN

Original release
- Network: tvN
- Release: November 6, 2015 – January 16, 2016

Related
- Reply 1997; Reply 1994

Reply 1988 (Korean: 응답하라 1988) is a South Korean television series and the third installment of the Reply anthology series. Set in the 1980s when South Korea underwent major political and economic changes, it revolves around five friends and their families living in the same neighborhood in Seoul. It aired every Friday and Saturday from November 6, 2015 to January 16, 2016 on tvN spanning 20 episodes.

The series received widespread critical and audience acclaim with its finale episode recording an 18.8% nationwide audience share, making it the highest rated drama in Korean cable television history at the time of airing. It became a cultural phenomenon initiating the newtro boom in South Korea and is often called a "National Drama". Regarded as a television masterpiece by the BBC, it is credited with ushering in South Korea's cable television era, increasing realistic and nostalgic media domestically, and popularizing Korean drama internationally.

== Premise ==
In 1988, five childhood friends who all reside in Seoul's Ssangmun-dong district with their families rely on one another to get through their difficult adolescence and forge a future together.

== Cast and characters ==
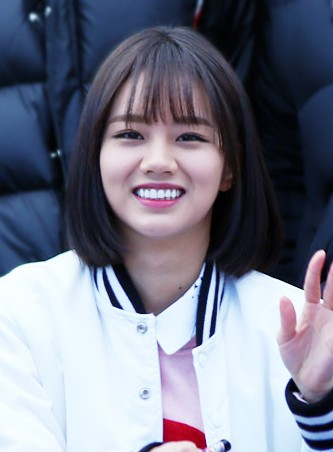
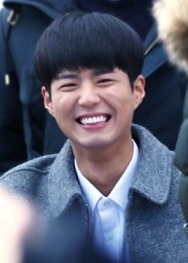
Leads Lee Hye-ri (Deok-sun) and Park Bo-gum (Taek) in costume as their characters at a fan-signing event for the series, February 2016

=== Sung family ===
- Sung Dong-il as Sung Dong-il
  - A fraud and security specialist at a bank, Dong-il fell into debt after lending money to a friend who never paid it back. He struggles to provide for his family as he wants to while paying off the debt, but does his best to give everything he can to his children. He and his wife, Il-hwa, argue a lot but love each other very deeply.
- Lee Il-hwa as Lee Il-hwa
  - Il-hwa is a kind woman who spends much of her time with the other moms and caring for her family. She worries about her children and husband and shows much of her care by cooking massive quantities of food to share with her family and the neighbourhood.
- Ryu Hye-young as Sung Bo-ra
  - Bo-ra is a tough-as-nails college student who wants to become a lawyer. She attended the Teacher's College of Seoul National University under the Department of Mathematics Education to save tuition fee although her test scores qualify her for the Department of Law. She participated in the June Democratic Struggle against the military regime under Chun Doo-hwan. While outwardly stoic, she has a warm heart and shows compassion to those who need it most. Where her younger sister Deok-sun struggles academically but excels in interpersonal relationships, Bo-ra is a stellar student who stumbles in social and emotional situations.
- Lee Hye-ri as Sung Deok-sun / Sung Soo-yeon
  - The middle child of her family, she is infamously ranked 999th in school and is the only girl in their group of five neighbourhood friends. Though not academically gifted, Deok-sun has a bright and compassionate personality. She cares deeply for her friends and classmates but feels lost without a "dream" to pursue. Deok-sun moves through the stages of her youth alongside her male friends, and the mystery of which of them she eventually marries is a continual point of tension for viewers throughout the series. She later becomes a flight attendant.
- Choi Sung-won as Sung No-eul
  - Dong-il's only son and assistant in his schemes, No-eul is a kindhearted young teen with a poetic, dreamer's mind. He is also a good singer.

=== Kim family ===
- Kim Sung-kyun as Kim Sung-kyun
  - Sung-kyun is a kind and humorous man who runs an electronics store and formerly worked at a Chinese restaurant as a delivery man. He loves to joke and play with the neighborhood kids, and generally keeps an air of joviality among the adults. Although he often seems childish and unhelpful to her, he adores his wife, Mi-ran, and hopes for good futures for his sons.
- Ra Mi-ran as Ra Mi-ran
  - A strong lady with a tough past, Mi-ran is the indisputable empress of the Kim household. Worried and annoyed about his eldest son Jung-bong's constant academic failures punctuated by obsessions. Mi-ran can sometimes come off as short-tempered but this temper is really an expression of her anxiety and love for her children and family.
- Ahn Jae-hong as Kim Jung-bong
  - A student who failed his college entrance exam six times, Jung-bong would rather collect posters and stamps, solve Rubik's cubes and play arcade games rather than studying and thinking about his future. He has an often child-like personality and is easily distracted. Nevertheless, Jung-bong is kind, thoughtful, compassionate, and easy to like. He happily cares for the neighbourhood kids including Jin-joo, Sun-woo's little sister. He is a surprisingly poetic and romantic. He later successfully attended the Department of Law of Sungkyungwan University.
- Ryu Jun-yeol as Kim Jung-hwan
  - Stoic and sarcastic but with a secretly sweet heart, Jung-hwan is called Jung-pal by his friends. Jung-hwan is smart and athletic, often taking on extra responsibility to fulfill the dreams of his older brother Jung-bong, who has a chronic heart condition. While Jung-hwan doesn't often share his emotions with others, he feels things deeply and uses his sarcasm and attitude as a shield. He develops feelings for Deok-sun early but is reluctant to admit his crush, even as the right timing slips away. He joined the Korea Air Force Academy and became a pilot for the Korean Air Force.

=== Kim-Sung family ===
- Kim Sun-young as Kim Sun-young
  - A kind young widow, Sun-young dotes on her children as much as possible to try to make up for their father's absence. She struggles with her mother-in-law and does her best to keep the family afloat. With a sunny personality and an upbeat disposition, she is always looking for the best side of any situation and can make even the most bear-like person laugh.
- Go Kyung-pyo as Sung Sun-woo
  - A class president, caring brother, and dependable son to his widowed mother, Sun-woo is an ideal young man. He is devoted to his friends and dotes on his younger sister, Jin-joo. Sun-woo is thought to be the most "normal" among the five neighborhood friends. He harbours a secret crush on Deok-sun's older sister that lingers into adulthood. He later enters the Medical College of Yonsei University.
- Kim Seol as Jin-joo
  - A precocious toddler doted on by everyone in the neighbourhood, Jin-joo adores sausages, bananas and red bean buns. She loves her older brother but is a bit more reserved with others.

=== Choi family ===
- Choi Moo-sung as Choi Moo-sung
  - A widower, he is the owner of a watch and jewellry store called Bonghwangdang, at the entrance to the alley. Moo-sung moved to Ssangmundong after the death of his wife. He was adopted into the neighborhood family as he raised Taek by himself. Quiet and reserved, Moo-sung's unassuming exterior conceals hidden depths of emotion and compassion for his son, his friends, and the neighbourhood as a whole.
- Park Bo-gum as Choi Taek
  - An internationally renowned genius baduk player, Taek is the quietest of his neighborhood friends. Taek dominates on the baduk board but struggles with simple everyday tasks. His baduk success has brought money and fame but has left him distant from his age group so he relies on his friends for companionship, grounding, and connection to other teens. Taek is generous to a fault and hesitant to make a fuss, but that hesitancy disappears in competition. However, when he realises that the person he cares for has another admirer, he has to weigh romance against friendship.

=== Ryu family ===
- Yoo Jae-myung as Ryu Jae-myung
  - A dean at the local boys high school and biology teacher, he previously took Mathematics Education at the Teacher's College of Pusan National University in Busan, Gyeognam but transferred to the Biological Education Department. He becomes a tutor due to earn extra cash. Jae-myung once harboured dreams of becoming a dancer when he visited a dancing club at USFK's Busan Naval Base. Now focused on shaping the men of the future, he does his best to keep his son in check while still enjoying life.
- Lee Dong-hwi as Ryu Dong-ryong
  - The neighbourhood clown, Dong-ryong loves to sing, dance, and play jokes on his friends. Like Deok-sun, Dong-ryong is not a natural academic, but his thoughtful insight and surprising wisdom serve him and his friends well. As the son of two working parents surrounded by tight-knit families, Dong-ryong sometimes feels neglected by his parents and makes up for their absence by acting out. He is known for his disgusting nature whilst with the group, much to the anger of the others. His nosy nature also means that he ends up knowing many of the neighbourhood's secrets before anyone else.

=== Extended ===
- Lee Min-ji as Jang Mi-ok
  - Born into a wealthy family, she is a good friend to Deok-sun and is practical and excitable. She gets in trouble with her family after she starts dating someone from Deok-sun's neighbourhood.
- Lee Se-young as Wang Ja-hyun
  - A reliable friend to Deok-sun and Mi-ok, Ja-hyun is focused on boys and becoming a hairstylist.
- Kim Joong-Ki as Kim Joong-Ki / Michol
  - A fellow student and friend of Sun-woo, Dong-ryong and Jung-hwan. He enters the Medical College of Yonsei University with Sun-woo.
- Lee Mi-yeon as adult Sung Deok-sun
- Kim Joo-hyuk as adult Choi Taek
- Jeon Mi-seon as adult Sung Bo-ra
- Woo Hyun as adult Sung No-eul
- Lee Chung-mi as Nam Goong Neul-bo
- Lee Jin-kwon as a bad student
- Seo Cho-won
- Park Ah-sung
- Nam Mi-jung as a fortune teller
- Oh Hee-joon as a football teammate
- Jang Hee-jung as a National Singing contest judge
- Song Young-gyu as Sun-young's older brother
- Yong Young-jae as the director of the Korea Baduk Association
- Bae Yoo-ram

=== Special appearances ===
- Kim Young-ok as Deok-sun's grandmother (ep. 2)
- Jung Won-joong as Dong-il's older brother (ep. 2)
- Kim Soo-ro as a snack shop owner (ep. 3)
- Lee Moon-sae (voice) as radio DJ (ep. 6)
- Park Ji-yoon as a TV interviewer (ep. 7)
- Park Jeong-min as Bo-ra's boyfriend (ep. 8)
- Kim Tae-hoon as a cardiac surgeon (ep. 8)
- Lee Soo-kyung as Lee Soo-kyung, No-eul's girlfriend (ep. 8)
- Jung Yoo-min as Bo-ra's friend (ep. 8)
- Jung Hae-in as Kim Bo-young, Deok-sun's middle school friend (ep. 13)
- Shin Young-jin as the class president's mother (ep. 14)
- Greg Priester as Stevie Greg, a contestant in the KBS National Singing Competition (ep. 16)
- Ahn Sung-ki (ep. 17)
- Jung Woo as Trash (ep. 18)
- Go Ara as Sung Na-Jung (ep. 18) (archived footage)
- Son Eun-seo as Deok-sun's colleague (ep. 18, 19 and 20)
- Yoo Dam-yeon as Jo, Dong-ryong's mother (ep. 10, 17, 18, 19 and 20)
- Ko Chang-seok as Mi-ok's father (ep. 19)
- Lee Jong-hyuk (voice) as adult Sun-woo (ep. 20)

== Episodes ==
No. in series	Title	Directed by	Written by	Original release date
1	"Hand in Hand"	Shin Won-ho	Lee Woo-jung	November 6, 2015
September 1988. One evening, five neighborhood friends, all born in 1971, watch "A Better Tomorrow II" in the bedroom of Taek, when one by one, their parents call them back home for dinner. Deok-sun is the middle child of the Sung family, led by Dong-il and Il-hwa, that struggles to make ends meet. She fights a lot with her older sister, Bo-ra, who is a student at Seoul University, and is sometimes jealous of her younger brother, No-eul. Deok-sun demands her birthday celebration to be separated from her sister's, whose birthday is three days before hers. They live in a 'half-basement' home. Jung-hwan is the youngest child of the Kim family, a family of relative wealth, which lives upstairs to Deok-sun. Their breadwinner is Sung-kyun, an eccentric and often childish electronics store worker. The father's behavior is frowned upon by Jung-hwan and his mother, Mi-ran, and by nearly everybody except Deok-sun. The tech-savvy first-born son, the 24-year-old Jung-bong, refuses to study and angers Mi-ran further. Sun-woo is the oldest child of his family and lives with his widowed mother, Sun-young, and younger sister, Jin-joo, in the house up the street from Deok-sun's. His mother is a bad cook, but he approves of her cooking because it's hers. Across the street, Dong-ryong lives with two full-time working parents, Ssangmun High School's fearsome dean, Mr. Ryu, being his father. The families share and switch side dishes to go with their evening rice, sending their children to exchange those dishes. Taek, who lives next to Dong-ryong, goes downstairs and has dinner with his widowed father, Moo-sung; their dinner table is slowly filled with dishes their neighbors brought to them. The neighborhood mothers discuss whether sons or daughters are best while preparing food. Dong-ryong and Jung-hwan confront a gang of people who want to steal their money to buy tteokbokki and lose their sneakers, after their classmate 'Michol' (nick-named after a Dooly the Little Dinosaur character) has lost all of his money. Sun-woo involves himself in the case and hurts himself in a fight, and his mother is concerned about him, especially after finding his room empty after calling him for errands. She is concerned that her son had taken up smoking, but he comes home after buying a drink for his father's altar. Deok-sun is preparing hard for her role as picket holder for the Madagascar delegation at the Seoul Olympics opening ceremony, about to be held on her 18th (Korean age) birthday. She struggles, but she is committed, practicing every night in the bedroom she shares with Bo-ra and in the streets after rehearsing. As she is one of only three high schoolers taking part in the event, the entire neighborhood is talking about her role. Stakes become very high when rehearsals start in the Olympic stadium. During a TV interview, Deok-sun finds out that Madagascar is part of the countries that refuse to take part in the games. However, her reaction in the television broadcast impresses the Olympic organisation, and she is reassigned to the Ugandan delegation. After fulfilling her role as a picket holder in front of the world, she comes home to her father, who gives her a separate birthday cake. That night, the Sung family experience carbon monoxide poisoning while sleeping and flee out of their house.
2	"The One Thing You're Mistaken About Me"	Shin Won-ho	Lee Woo-jung	November 7, 2015
Grandma, the mother of Dong-il, visits the Sung family. She tells her granddaughters about how she bore and raised two daughters and two sons, and how the oldest-born son worked jobs to earn money at a young age so that their father could study hard and become a banker. Deok-sun adores her. The next morning, Deok-sun is late for school, but finds time to greet Taek on her way. Deok-sun is befriended with two classmates at the Ssangmun Girls' High, Wang Ja-hyun 'Joey Wong' and Jang Mi-ok 'Maggie Cheung'. The parents joke about how everyone wants Taek, a baduk player of the 6th dan, to be their son-in-law after he wins a major tournament with the equivalent of 50.000 dollars in prize money, enough to buy a high-end apartment. Bo-ra later comes home, and announces that her superior wants her to go on a trip. The Seoul Olympics have come to an end, with Korea winning the largest amount of medals in their history. Dong-ryong, who has instant foods for his meals every day, complains how bad Sun-woo's meal is, to the disdain of the class president. The boys later play shirtless soccer, and Sun-woo impresses the opponent's captain. He is picked on for wearing his father's bracelet by the opponent, but defends himself. That evening, Dong-ryong plans to sneak into the cinema without tickets, but rethinks that and instead borrows an adult movie to watch at Taek's. The next evening, Dong-ryong, Sun-woo and Jung-hwan attempt to hitch a seat at the cinema, but they get caught. At the girls' school, the juniors each get a different book about romance or another topic to read. Deok-sun panics when she hears she has to meet the headmaster. Instead of a punishment, she gets a phone call with bad news: her beloved grandma has died. When arriving at grandma's hometown with her family, she is surprised that nobody, including her dad, feels down or saddened, happily eating Korean barbecue and drinking copious amounts of soju. Dong-il is instead happy to see family and friends again who he has not seen for a long time. Only after the first-born of grandma, coming all the way from a laundromat in the United States, arrives at the site, everyone breaks down. The next evening, Dong-il is back in town, and asks Taek when he misses his mother the most. Taek, who lost his mother at the age of five, responds with a clear answer: every day. As the youths come together to celebrate his birthday, the episode flashes back to the 1970s, when they were toddlers. Taek moved to Seoul with his father after his mother died to cope with the loss, and despite his shyness, he was accepted as a friend by the other, much noisier kids. Deok-sun fights with Bo-ra after she accuses her elder of reading her diary, which she still keeps with her to this day.
3	"Not Guilty If You're Rich, Guilty If You're Poor"	Shin Won-ho	Lee Woo-jung	November 13, 2015
October 1988. Joey and Maggie congratulate Deok-sun with getting a boyfriend after assuming Sun-woo has a crush on her. She has in fact dated Sun-woo for the first time in the past summer. The girls practice hard for their performance at a school trip, with a cassette player at stake. Deok-sun is motivated, because she now has to share her player with her sister. Dong-il gets mad after seeing boiled potatoes on the dinner table. Il-hwa is mad at him for spending all the little money that is left after paying expenses and debt on useless things and alcohol, instead of saving it. Dong-il then proceeds to say that sellers of useless things are sympathetic, as young as his children or reminiscent of his mother. Mi-ran is irritated with Sung-kyun to such an extent that she jokes about selling him off. Jung-bong is caught saving postal stamps instead of studying. Il-hwa tells Mi-ran that the Sung family is poor, because they are indebted. Moo-sung struggles with cooking meals for his son. When she goes off with her school on the trip, Deok-sun is reminded to never lose her parents' expensive camera. When she finds out that she left the camera in the train, she breaks down, and her headmaster informs her parents calmly about this event. She continues the trip with a good mood. Meanwhile, No-eul is caught selling alcohol in the streets, and Il-hwa is concerned further. Sung-kyun buys an expensive jacket which he thinks is of good quality, only for it to easily break its zipper. When Joey and Maggie attempt to venture into the boy's pavilion, they are injured after falling from a high ledge. Jung-hwan, Dong-ryong and Sun-woo are reluctant to replace them, but they accept the offer. They perform so well that they win the cassette player for their neighborhood friend. Deok-sun and Jung-hwan run off, but are being chased by master Ryu. They are driven into a small hole in the wall, where their bodies are pressed against each other. Deok-sun gets home, and is chased by an angry mother because of losing the camera. Sung-kyun and Mi-ran talk about their past, when they were so poor they had to borrow money from everyone. It is revealed that they became rich overnight three years ago. When tofu was a luxury in the Kim household, Jung-bong was busy saving Olympic-themed lottery tickets, priced at the amount of money their house could be heated for three days. One of those tickets presented the family good fortune: they had won the jackpot.
4	"Can't help ~ing"	Shin Won-ho	Lee Woo-jung	November 14, 2015
November 1988. Deok-sun and Jung-hwan miss the bus to school. The next day, they succeed, but it gets tumultuous in the full bus. In an attempt to stabilize herself, Deok-sun rips open the shirt of Jung-hwan in an embarrassing moment. As their final year of high school gets closer, the youths of Ssangmun spend more and more time in rooms dedicated to studying. They listen to music, study and fall asleep. Deok-sun has decided to study hard, but refuses to get tutored by Bo-ra. The parents eat with the Kim family, where fried fish is served; a luxury for the Sung family. In order to get better at focusing, taking up baduk is suggested for Deok-sun. She spends one evening with Taek, where she fails to remember the rules of baduk. It's Mi-ran's birthday, and the Kim family eat out at a pork cutlet restaurant. When Sung-kyun calls everyone for dinner, the family members appear distant to each other, and the family elder struggles to keep everyone together and in a good mood, while the waiter asks if he could take a picture of them as a souvenir. Dong-il is revealed to like marinated clams so much, he angers his wife over their absence at the dinner table. Tired of the fights between his parents, No-eul puts on the TV loud. After coming home, Sung-kyun tries to attract family members by buying premium ice cream, but finds the box untouched and the ice cream melted. Drinking in broad daylight, the ladies complain about their husbands' behavior, and deem Sun-young the luckiest one before suggesting she should be together with Moo-sung. The kids gather to get tutored by Bo-ra. She is gravely disappointed with the work attitude of most of her juniors. Taek lost to a novice opponent, and has difficulties dealing with his very first professional match loss. The neighborhood friends come to help, skipping dinner with their parents to gather at his place. They say discouraging things to Taek, who soon realises they are jokes. They teach him to let things out by swearing, and they spend the rest of the night doing fun things. Disappointed with the school grades of their middle child, Dong-il and Il-hwa eat at a restaurant together to cope. They see another couple loving each other, and that inspires them to get along. Sung-kyun gets further disengaged with the rest of his family. Jung-hwan realizes that, and greets his father the way the elder likes to greet Deok-sun, only to tell him he eats dinner elsewhere. His mood is lifted when his wife makes him a hot meal and asks him for soju. Similarly, Il-hwa cheers Dong-il up with freshly marinated clams. Deok-sun tends to Jung-hwan when he stubbed his toe, and goes to school with him the next rainy morning.
5	"Ready for Winter"	Shin Won-ho	Lee Woo-jung	November 20, 2015
After former President and dictator Chun Doo-hwan apologizes for his actions, Seoul experiences a wave of renewed student protests. Dong-il is caught in these protests and gives his pocket money to a student to pay for his way home. The breadwinner gets home safely, but with Bo-ra nowhere in sight. Bo-ra later enters the living room and fights with her parents. In her room, she cleans up wounds on her forearms and checks a note for a follow-up meeting with a political party. When the mothers gather, Il-hwa assumes that her eldest daughter is taking part in the protests. During recess, Sun-woo successfully re-enacts a popular commercial, but when asked to do it again, he falls and injures his ankle. Concerned about her son, Sun-young plans to cook him certain foods, but Sun-woo thinks she may not be able to afford the ingredients needed. She buys both of her children banana milk instead. When an amount of briquettes are delivered to the Kim household that could warm their house for a thousand days, Sun-young defends herself against comments about her poverty and appearance. Mi-ran, who had to warm her house with firewood until not long ago, is concerned about the way Sun-young's mother-in-law treats her daughter-in-law. When Sun-woo's paternal grandmother pays a visit, Sun-woo politely declines any conversation, after which she talks down on Sun-young on her financial situation and how she lives in her house for free, on the pension of her son, after he died. Deok-sun goes to the study room for the first time, but soon falls asleep. She dreams of being in a relationship with Sun-woo. At the meantime, Jung-hwan is asleep in front of the TV and dreams of being in a relationship with Deok-sun. Leaving the study room late, she manages to get a ride home under Jung-hwan's umbrella. Mi-ran is irritated that the men in her house are lazy, dirty and incompetent in doing housework, or at least appear as so. A concerned housewife, she explains everything that needs to be done in the house in detail before she leaves home for the weekend to tend to her mother, who has injured herself. Jung-bong turns out to have extensive expertise in housekeeping. After Mi-ran leaves, the gentlemen do as they wish, finish the leftovers she ordered them to eat for dinner and clean the house in a hurry just before she returns. It turns out that they intentionally keep Mi-ran busy with tasks since she could afford to be a housewife. Deok-sun is requested by her parents to study as hard as her older sister, when the latter is seen protesting in front on television. Bo-ra comes home, and her parents are enraged. She is grounded by her father, who guards the door of her room tightly to prevent her escape in the middle of the night. Her mother insists that she at least gets to eat. Unlike her mother-in-law, Sun-young's own mother is a warmhearted person who cares about her children. She pays a visit to her, shows concern for Sun-woo, and brings in goods before having to leave quickly. Luckily, she has time to call her daughter by phone that evening. Jin-joo requests a banana from her mother, which costs a fortune in 1980s Korea. After receiving a hefty sum of money from her mother, Sun-young treats her children with a real banana. One day, Il-hwa finds her daughters' bedroom empty and searches for her troubled daughter. Bo-ra is on her way to a conference with the protest group when she gets arrested. Only after her mother defends her firstborn child to the tooth by explaining that her child is the pride of the neighborhood, Bo-ra confesses to the police officer and her mother what she has done. Jung-hwan sneaks into Sun-woo's room and finds out through dictionary notes that Deok-sun is having a crush on Sun-woo.
6	"The First Snow Is Coming"	Shin Won-ho	Lee Woo-jung	November 21, 2015
December 1988. Dong-ryong helps pack Taek's suitcase for his next tournament in China and requests him to buy pizza for his friends when he gets home. Taek instead insists that he watches a movie with his prize money. At the tournament, he is the only representative of Korea left, and he has a handicap of three dan against most opponents and six consecutive lost matches behind him. Jung-bong regularly writes letters to the editors of the nationally broadcast radio program Starry Nights, and with his seventh college entrance exam upcoming, he gets several letters of his read on the show, in which he wishes good luck to Taek and praises Bo-ra. Taek makes it to the final round of the tournament, and Bo-ra saves his butt while he is confronted by two unruly, smoking men. Jung-hwan finds out that Deok-sun plans to send a letter about her crush on Sun-woo to Starry Nights. Taek wins the tournament, and orders pizza to eat for his friends. During the pizza party, Deok-sun asks Sun-woo to confess his love on the first day of snow. Instead of confessing to Deok-sun, he meets up with Bo-ra on the first day of snow. When she bawls her eyes out after realizing that Sun-woo has his eyes on her sister instead of her, the love letter she sent to Starry Nights is read aloud on the show. Taek phones Deok-sun and asks her if she wants to see a movie with him.
7	"To You"	Shin Won-ho	Lee Woo-jung	November 27, 2015
The episode starts with Sun-woo's confession to Bo-ra. Bo-ra rejects Sun-woo as she already has a boyfriend and Sun-woo is younger. The neighborhood's children play Secret Santa on the initiative of Jung-bong, who is collecting LPs and would like someone to buy a record he misses from his collection. Bo-ra does not like taking part in games, but Sun-woo insists that she still take part. Taek picks and slips the paper into his pocket before he leaves early. Dong-ryong meets the fate of picking his own name. Bo-ra and Sun-woo pick each other. The parents discuss which presents to get for Christmas. For long hours, they cannot decide how to play Santa for Jin-joo, who is purposely kept asleep. Sun-young tells the other parents that Jin-joo was told the previous year (by Bo-ra) that Santa does not exist, which the toddler later confirms. Nevertheless, the parents try to make her believe in Santa again, as only he can get what she wants: a snowman. Sun-woo meets up with Jung-hwan, who insists to watch Die Hard with him later that afternoon. He declines, as he finds more value in studying. Jung-hwan then tells him that he found out he likes Bo-ra, and is surprised that he does not like Deok-sun. After the parents have decided what to get for Jin-joo, they all insist to leave, but Sun-young and Sung-kyun decide to order Chinese. Moo-sung is concerned that Taek won't eat dinner while he is training at the baduk association, doing everything he can to bounce back from several consecutive losses. Il-hwa asks Deok-sun to order delivery for the entire block, while Sung-kyun and Mi-ran are fighting. Moo-sung waits outside the association, in streaming rain, for Taek to come. During dinner, Jung-bong and No-eul are shown to be good friends and that they're each other's secret santa. No-eul promises to get Jung-bong his LP and asks for an adult content book. Jung-bong says that he knows someone with that book. Jung-hwan reads the mentioned book in Taek's room. Deok-sun comes in and is embarrassed about this. They exchange rumors about which person has drawn which person's name. It is revealed that Deok-sun has to buy a present for Jung-hwan. Moo-sung sits down for an interview about his son shortly before he leaves to Busan to compete. Taek calls Deok-sun and asks what he could get for his father as a birthday gift. Deok-sun misinterprets this, thinking that he has picked her for Secret Santa, and asks for pink gloves. Mi-ran gets jealous of Sun-young because of the good-hearted, hardworking nature of Sun-woo compared to her own two sons. Instead of forcing Dong-ryong to sleep at home, Sun-woo puts him in a more comfortable position in the study room, as he understands that he does not want to sleep where his dad is. He then goes outside to meet Bo-ra. It rains, and Sun-woo does not want her to get wet, so he gives her his umbrella, much to her dismay. Sun-young meets with Moo-sung after the interview. The interviewer had asked for his wife's conception dream and time of his son's birth, something fathers cannot answer. Moo-sung feels sorry for his son for not having an ordinary childhood and ordinary household, especially when it comes to food. Sun-young then tells him she saw him trying his very best to be a good father to his son, and Taek really appreciates that. Moo-sung then spends much of his time drinking. Deok-sun meets with Joey and Maggie at a McDonald's, far away from Ssangmun, where they ask Deok-sun if a boy she knows could join the table, preferably Jung-hwan. Deok-sun is disgusted, but still calls Jung-hwan, who arrives at their table surrounded by a flattered Joey and Maggie. Deok-sun goes home with him that night, and he tells her that he has Taek as Secret Santa, to the unpleasant surprise of Deok-sun. Jung-bong steals the book from Jung-hwan and gives it to No-eul. On Christmas Eve, the teens watch the MBC College Campus Song Festival together (the series' title song wins it that year). Sun-woo hands Bo-ra her present. The parents discuss how exactly they would build the snowman they had promised Jin-joo, because upcoming rainy weather would make that very difficult. They come up with the idea to sculpt a snowman out of ice, since there is an ice vendor in the neighborhood, and they are not worried about rain on Christmas Eve. Taek returns from Busan at midnight and meets Deok-sun who was waiting for him. Taek thanks Deok-sun for the present idea which disappoints Deok-sun as she realizes the gloves weren't meant for her. Taek goes home and gifts his father the pink gloves. Moo-sung is very appreciative of this gesture. No-eul comforts Deok-sun that Taek must've forgotten he was playing Secret Santa. Taek indeed did forget and is reminded when he feels his pocket as he was about to sleep. He rushes to Deok-sun and agrees to get her the same gloves he got for his dad. The sculpture is a success, however, it melts entirely, as it does rain on Christmas Eve. Sun-woo clarifies to the disappointed parents that Jin-joo calls a waffle cone with two scoops of vanilla ice cream a 'snowman' and gets some for his sister at the nearby shop. Deok-sun is elated when No-eul hands her a box of pink gloves. She is thankful to Taek but No-eul corrects that it was from Jung-hwan which leaves Deok-sun confused. Taek receives a video tape from one of his managers. On it is a part of the interview his father gave which was not aired on TV. In it, Moo-sung directs himself to his son and says 'I love you', regretting that he did not express such love to his son before.
8	"One Warm Word"	Shin Won-ho	Lee Woo-jung	November 28, 2015
Every morning, Moo-sung makes breakfast for his son and sweeps the street, this time showing off his pink gloves. Deok-sun meets with friends at the tteokbokki shop. Joey and Maggie think that Deok-sun has a crush on Jung-hwan, angering her. When Deok-sun returns home, she finds her mother angered, because a large sum of money disappeared out of her wallet. Bo-ra immediately suspects her younger sister, while Deok-sun thinks No-eul did it. Il-hwa suspects that her son is in the rebellious phase of his life and does not blame him. Dong-il comes home late. Drunk, he is yelled at by his wife for using up his time and money to 'help out others'. Jung-bong fails his college admission exam for the sixth time. Mi-ran is mad and disappointed, while Sung-kyun says failure is nothing to worry about and is still proud of his oldest son. The parents worry about his upcoming heart surgery: Jung-bong wears a pacemaker and needs to have its batteries replaced. The once-poor family can now afford the best hospital of the country to perform surgery on Jung-bong. The oldest son is still very scared and concerned that he would not make it, packing all his possessions in boxes in case for the worst. Bo-ra and Sun-woo call each other. Sun-woo suspects that Bo-ra already has a boyfriend. The boys discuss how people show that they are attracted to someone. Bo-ra meets up with a good college friend, who reveals that she has kissed Bo-ra's boyfriend. Bo-ra sees her boyfriend and he tells her that he ends his relationship with her. Sun-woo remarks that it was Bo-ra that advised him to express his feelings when his father died two years ago, and formally begins his relationship with her. For the surgery, Jung-bong needs to be sober and not consume any food for an extended period of time. Mi-ran brings festive foods to the hospital, which her son refuses to eat. Sung-kyun praises the strength of his wife. The night before the surgery, Mi-ran tells Jung-bong that he is very strong, having to deal with a heart condition since a young age, and breaks down in tears. The surgery is a success, and Jung-bong does not have to go under the knife for a decade. No-eul is revealed to have a girlfriend: he calls her and meets with her. Deok-sun meets with Joey and Maggie, and sees her brother hanging around with a rebellious gang. No-eul cries, and while attempting to save her brother, Deok-sun starts a fight, involving his friends and her friends, and they get arrested. It soon turns out that the rebels are misjudged because of their unusual hairstyle. No-eul's girlfriend lives with her sister since their parents died in a car accident. To deal with the loss, she had taken up bad habits, while people around her said it was alright. No-eul was the first person to tell her that she should quit smoking, and that is when they fell in love.
9	"Crossing The Line"	Shin Won-ho	Lee Woo-jung	December 4, 2015
January 1989. Dong-il and Il-hwa warn their youngest children about kidnappers and low grades. Deok-sun is almost attacked by a kidnapper, who turns out to be Jung-hwan. The parents notice that Moo-sung is absent and his shop closed. Starry Night organises a public jam session on January 11, with big names on the lineup. Deok-sun is particularly excited about this concert. She reluctantly attends the jam with Jung-hwan after the other boys reveal that they have other plans; the two get a picture taken at the concert together. Sun-woo continues dating Bo-ra, but struggles in connecting to her as a loving person, instead of Deok-sun's childhood friend. Bo-ra masks her dates, saying she meets up with fellow student protesters. The relationship fares well, despite the fact that Bo-ra is older than Sun-woo. Life continues to be unfair for the widowed parents. Moo-sung is in Busan to pay respects to a friend of his who recently died at age 45, leaving behind a wife and 10-year-old daughter. He explains the harsh reality of life and death to another friend, who is grappling with grief and uncertainty. Taek stays home and eats with his neighbors. Sun-young receives a letter from the district court that her house, formally owned by her mother-in-law, would be taken from her and sold if she does not complete a payment of 10 million won. She is afraid of taking too much money and help from her fellow housewives to make ends meet. Shortly after Moo-sung returns home, he falls unconscious and collapses. Dong-il, who planned to have some drinks with him, arrives on time to call emergency services and save his life. This incident means that someone else than his usual companions must accompany Taek during his upcoming tournament in Shanghai. Moo-sung appoints Deok-sun for that task, assuming she likes his son. Deok-sun receives a coveted passport and travels to China to assist Taek with his tasks. In the hotel, she becomes known as a chaotic, but cheerful and lovable young woman, who communicates the best she can with the Chinese staff to get everything according to her and Taek's wishes. Taek sleeps well without the abundance of sleeping pills he usually takes, and plays baduk at his best. Deok-sun gets a picture taken with Taek at the hotel after the tournament. Moo-sung and Sun-young are assisted by their neighborhood and faraway friends and family for their hardships. Moo-sung receives food and help as his motor skills are affected, and Sun-young receives the needed amount of money from her older brother. The widowed parents meet at the hospital. Moo-sung was surprised that Sun-young, someone he sees every day, did not inform him about her potential eviction. It is revealed that the two were childhood friends while growing up in the south-east of the country, and that Sun-young convinced him to move to Seoul after the death of his wife to prevent him from falling addicted to alcohol and his son to be left behind in life. Moo-sung lived in Gimhae at the time, and his clock shop is named after the neighborhood he used to live in, Bonghwang-dong.
10	"Memory"	Shin Won-ho	Lee Woo-jung	December 5, 2015
Deok-sun meets with Joey and Maggie, who consider going to a group date, at her house. They tell her that Jung-hwan appears to actually have a crush on her, judging on his remarks. Sung-kyun has bought a new car, much to the dismay of his wife. Jung-bong is crazy about Bubble Bobble and attempts to finish all of the game's levels on one coin, gathering angry elementary schoolers around him. Instead of playing at an arcade elsewhere, he persists, and as he runs away from the young boys mad at him for not letting them play, he crashes into Maggie and instantly falls in love with her. Sun-young takes care of Moo-sung until he recovers and prepares him meals. She is concerned about him when he plans to help clear the table and do other tasks. Bo-ra is busy studying and leaves the ticket for a concert she planned to attend with Sun-woo on the desk of her study room. She rushes to the concert hall to bring the ticket back to him, but ends up attending the concert. Sun-woo, Bo-ra, Jung-hwan, Deok-sun and Taek head to the beach, where Dong-ryong is also going. Deok-sun accompanies Taek throughout the trip, eating at cafes and playing baduk against elderly men, who praise him for his skills. Taek and Deok-sun then go for a walk on the cold beach, when a volleyball shoots their direction; Taek protects Deok-sun from the impact. Sung-kyun celebrates his birthday, but he is not as happy as usual. It is this time of year that he feels melancholic, as he longs to his mother every time he is served seaweed soup. He decides to throw out stuff he had put in boxes and stored somewhere. Mi-ran stumbles upon an old audio cassette from when the boys were still toddlers, and plays it. Dong-ryong also celebrates his birthday. After being tasked to throw his own party with his parents' money for years, he is eager to finally get seaweed soup from his mother, Chief of an insurance company. As he comes home, he finds out it is the usual situation: his parents do not care about him. His friends throw him a birthday party instead. Deok-sun asks Jung-hwan if she should go on a blind date with one of Joey's former classmates. He advises against.
11	"Three Different Prophecies"	Shin Won-ho	Lee Woo-jung	December 11, 2015
Il-hwa, Mi-ran and Sun-young go to a fortune teller. She tells that Jung-bong awaits great fortune in life, causing Mi-ran to think that he will finally make it into a university this year. She estimates that Sun-woo is bound to do well, but Sun-young is destined to be more fortunate than her son. To Il-hwa, she advises her middle daughter to be called by the name Soo-yeon from now on, because it would increase her chances to go to a college in Seoul. At home, Dong-il disagrees with the prophecies of the fortune teller, especially with calling his daughter by another name. Joey is sad because a boy dumped her. Maggie and Soo-yeon immediately know why: Joey has confessed her love towards him too soon. Jung-hwan asks himself if he could get a hold on Soo-yeon as he realises that Taek is a serious challenger. Mi-ran gathers the neighborhood for a meal of Hamburg steak. Soo-yeon is asked to drop the meal off at Taek's room, as he refuses to leave his room in preparation for his next match. Soo-yeon holds on tightly to her new name, determined to make it into college. The mothers play Go-Stop. As they discuss playing against Mr. Ryu to the men, they are warned about the dean's cheating behavior. Sun-woo always insists to be the good son and eat dinner with his mother and sister every evening, no matter his schedule. To stretch the ends of her husband's pensions and simply have more to spend, Sun-young now works as a cleaner at a jjimjilbang every evening. She tries her best to not make her children realise. Dong-il, revealed to be an anti-fraud inspector at his bank, plays a match of Go-Stop against Mr. Ryu and soon overpowers the dean by barring him from cheating. The Kim family hears that Jung-bong has failed his college entrance exam again, leading to Mi-ran distrusting the fortune teller. As Sun-young decides to work longer hours during the holidays, Moo-sung meets up with her more often, and babysits Jin-joo when she is working. As now, all Koreans are allowed to travel abroad, Mi-ran and Sung-kyun prepare to go vacationing in Japan for Lunar New Year. While Sun-woo and Bo-ra have their first kiss, Jung-hwan and Soo-yeon briefly spend the night together, in one bed. Sun-young tells Moo-sung that the fortune teller predicted "another son coming at her" next year.
12	"Superman Has Returned"	Shin Won-ho	Lee Woo-jung	December 18, 2015
February 1989. Between long hours of studying, Sun-woo and Bo-ra meet up as often as they can afford to. Aiming to keep their relation secret, they call each other up in the middle of the night one day, but the younger kids in the street notice. Taek notifies to his friends that he can confirm they are in a relationship, angering Soo-yeon. Bo-ra brings food to Sun-woo and they stay in his room until Sun-young comes in, while Soo-yeon joins the dinner table at Jung-hwan's. Sun-young negotiates prices on the market while Moo-sung improves his relationship with Jin-joo, who is learning how to write. The mothers discuss their children's grades and school attitudes as they approach their last year of school. Jung-bong is in a letter writing frenzy, hoping that he can keep in touch with Maggie. Bo-ra tells Sun-woo she is studying to become an accountant to earn extra money, as teaching math would be difficult because, owing to her participation in the student protests, she now has a criminal record. Dong-ryong loans a tape with 'X-rated content' from Michael; he and Taek get scammed. As the friends get together to eat cutlets, and Soo-yeon leaves for the toilet, a man with a long coat approaches her and shows his business. She manages to fend the man off by telling him he has a sausage too small to impress anybody, then breaks down in tears. Taek enters the lavatory to comfort her. Sun-woo is favoring Bo-ra over cutlets, and finds out that his mom is cleaning bathrooms all evening. After sending countless messages to his beloved girl, Jung-bong finally gets a letter. He finds out that Maggie is unable to write back because she was in a severe car accident.
13	"Loving Someone Means"	Shin Won-ho	Lee Woo-jung	December 12, 2015
When walking down the streets with Jung-hwan, Soo-yeon has a shock encounter with her middle school crush. Back home, she is asked by Moo-sung to encourage Taek to eat, as he is facing his next tournament. Dong-il and Sung-kyun drink and play Go together, while Sun-young discusses remarrying. Bo-ra meets up with her friends while planning to meet up with Sun-woo, who is introduced to them as a younger sibling of hers. Jung-bong sends chain letters to the kids in the neighborhood. The block gets threatened by a thief and chase him down, only to find out it was someone they know. The kids play Blue Marble, and Sung-kyun is busy trying to fix things, angering his wife by making things worse. Concerns about Taek grow when news of a plane crash comes out. Dong-il and Il-hwa are having a medical checkup, paid for by the husband's employer. The wife is concerned that she has breast cancer. Dong-il and Il-hwa concern themselves so much, they could not gather the energy to make dinner for the household. Fortunately, the doctor finds out Il-hwa just has a pocket of water under her breast. Jung-bong heads to the hospital to give a letter to Maggie. Inside is a special love note: the highly valued "Space Adventures" Blue Marble key card.
14	"Don't Worry, Dear"	Shin Won-ho	Lee Woo-jung	December 19, 2015
March 1989. Taek brings home fruit after winning the tournament and shares it with the neighborhood. Bo-ra studies hard, although Sun-woo alerts her about public holidays. The Kim family's clothes iron has broken down, and Sung-kyun manages to fix it, but as a result, the plug cord is too short for Mi-ran to actually iron clothes with it. Sun-woo builds a model plane for a school competition, using the instructions his father gave him when he was younger. He sees no problem with his mother working as his little sister grows up and gets taken care of by Moo-sung, as long as mom takes good care of her health. He later breaks down in tears, thinking about how hard his mother works for him, and he is not used to another man taking care of his mother and sister. Dong-il comes home late again after binge-drinking at the local stall after work, where he met up with the person to whom he is indebted to. Dong-il comes home, and announces that his debt has been paid off. The next morning, Il-hwa cooks a feast for breakfast, and the children beg for sneakers as they are about to restart school. The parents talk to Bo-ra about how they regret not being able to support her financially back then. Things are getting serious for the neighborhood kids now that they are in their final year of high school. Dong-ryong still refuses to focus on studying, and a new student takes her seat in the class of Soo-yeon. Maggie tells Soo-yeon and Joey she is going on a date with Jung-bong. They both arrive at the same restaurant, but take a seat on different floors, never meeting each other. After Jung-bong leaves out of frustration, Soo-yeon insists he return to the restaurant, and he succeeds in finding Maggie. The two have their first kiss. Sun-woo thinks about his father often, and mentions that even though he likes soccer and gladly plays it with his friends who prefer the sport, his real passion is baseball and he has not been able to play catch with someone since his father died. The new student has an epileptic seizure while in class, panicking everyone in the classroom, except Soo-yeon. When recovering, she is ashamed of who she is, but Soo-yeon manages to make her feel comfortable. The mother of the new student trusted Soo-yeon to do the right thing if her daughter, Song-hee, would have a seizure, because the principal found Soo-yeon best suited for that job. Sun-woo and Bo-ra are spotted dating again by Taek, as he tells Sun-woo that he likes Soo-yeon very much. As Sun-young and Moo-sung are getting closer to each other, and as Jin-joo has had an accident, Sun-woo misses his father more and more. Soo-yeon and Taek meet up with each other, and so do Jung-bong and Maggie in front of her mansion.
15	"Between Love and Friendship"	Shin Won-ho	Lee Woo-jung	December 25, 2015
Sun-woo takes Moo-sung to a field to play catch, and is surprised by how well Taek's father throws. As Bo-ra quits working, her parents reassure she is now in good hands. Dong-ryong is asked to order delivery once again for lunch, but Jung-bong makes him and his friends kimchi fried rice instead. Bo-ra blames her personality for her troublesome relationship with her father. Dong-ryong gets injured while riding motorbikes with Michol. Sun-woo reveals to Sun-young he likes Moo-sung. Taek's management team receives an unpleasant request of someone wishing to play baduk with the prodigy, and hold a 30-minute interview with him about his relationship with his father. Il-hwa tells Soo-yeon to study hard and make it into a university, as she will receive her odds of entering one soon. When she gets negative prospects, she breaks down in tears and apologises to her mother. She becomes the more determined to solve difficult math problems, asking Song-hee for help. At the meantime, Bo-ra is busy finding housing near her college to focus more on studying. Sung-kyun is humiliated by the strength of Moo-sung and decides to start exercising, breaking his back while doing so. When he arrives at the hospital, the surgery rooms overflow with people injured in a car pile-up. Fortunately, he is able to get surgery on time with the help of Taek. Dong-ryong and Michol get arrested. The former is scared that his mother would scold him, but as she comes in, the opposite happens: she gives her son a hug. The next morning, she stays to have breakfast with him, as he tells his mom all the stories about his neighborhood friends she has missed. Jung-bong is sent a chocolate bar with a message. By calling Maggie, he finds out that her father is very strict and he will have to date in secret. The neighborhood friends watch a TV dance show in Taek's room. Dong-ryong and Soo-yeon happily dance along together, leaving Taek and Jung-hwan flabbergasted.
16	"Life is Ironic – 1"	Shin Won-ho	Lee Woo-jung	December 26, 2015
The boys rumor that Taek will confess to Soo-yeon, as he plans to meet up with her the day after he finishes his next tournament. Moo-sung considers buying stocks, but Dong-il warns him. Jung-bong asks Soo-yeon what present he should give to Maggie, and starts folding a thousand paper cranes to have his wish granted. Meanwhile, Sun-young and Moo-sung grow closer to each other. Dong-ryong, who dreams of becoming a dancer, heads to a national dance-off competition, which sports a brand new car as its main prize. Bo-ra moves out to focus on her studies, and her parents try to hold back their concerns about her. The ladies contemplate taking part in the KBS National Singing Competition upon the announcement of its return. Five years ago, they took part as a group, but they completely messed up their audition. Upon advice of her bedridden husband, Mi-ran decides to take part on her own. She practices relentlessly, only for the cassette of her song to be swapped with the advertisement tape of the eggs salesman. Dong-ryong also took part, and his Western singing style falls out of favor with the judges. Just one person from the neighborhood advances to the next round: No-eul auditioned with his classmate after being asked to sing in front of his class.
17	"Life is Ironic – 2"	Shin Won-ho	Lee Woo-jung	January 8, 2016
April 1989. Graduation and the college entrance exams come ever nearer to the youngsters. Sun-young tends to an injured Moo-sung, while Mi-ran keeps being burdened by her husband. The boys play soccer while trespassing and get chased away; Taek carries away an injured Soo-yeon. Jung-bong and Moo-sung express their wishes for their close family members. Dong-ryong is hospitalized following a motorcycle accident and finally gets his mom's seaweed soup. Soo-yeon gets humbled when she visits Bo-ra at her dorm room. Relationships are broken in favor of education. January 1990. The class of 1971 have finished their college entrance exams and have received their results. Jung-hwan successfully enrols in the Air Force Academy. Sun-woo receives a full scholarship for Yonsei University Medical School, to the enthrallment of his mother. Soo-yeon, now Deok-sun again, frequents a community college in a smaller town, together with Dong-ryong. Jung-bong finally gets accepted into college; law school will be the main occupation for the next phase of his life. Taek continues to be a fierce baduk player, breaking three national records. October 1994. Mi-ran learns to ride the bicycle, Sun-young lives with Moo-sung, and No-eul attends songwriting school. Dong-il is glad he has gotten rid of his monetary problems, but cannot get used to both his daughters working and not eating dinner with him every day. The parents await the return of their children, who meet up for the first time in years.
18	"Goodbye, My First Love"	Shin Won-ho	Lee Woo-jung	January 9, 2016
The neighborhood friends celebrate the birthday of Taek, who is now a player of the highest dan. Pagers, computers and CDs are all the rage now. Deok-sun is a flight attendant for Korean Air, Jung-hwan is an airman with the rank of second lieutenant. Sun-woo is an excellent medical student, who studies in a small group together with Michol. He studies all the time, and on the rare occasions he gets home, he often does not much more than sleep. The parents discuss empty nests and wish for their children to start relationships. Il-hwa is increasingly concerned about the health of her family. Dong-il works until late seven days a week, as bank runs have become commonplace at his workplace. He announces that he might be better off resigning, as his job offers him twice the amount of retirement money if he does, but Il-hwa insists he keep on working. Jung-bong does what he has always done: not studying. However, he proves to be a good houseman. He owns a computer and runs a chat room, and discovers that Maggie has anything but forgotten him. Sun-woo is forced to replace one of his fellow students on a blind date, which turns out to be with Bo-ra. They agree to restart the relationship. Deok-sun attends a concert, but finds no one to go with her. Taek and Jung-hwan rush to the concert hall to get the ticket. The neighborhood friends now have time to meet up with each other regularly, and they do so as often as they can. They go out eating and drinking at Dong-ryong's barbecue restaurant. One meet-up, Jung-hwan professes his love for Deok-sun and offers his graduation ring in front of everyone but in the end says he was just joking.
19	"You Did Your Best"	Shin Won-ho	Lee Woo-jung	January 15, 2016
No-eul and Jin-joo happily take part in dating gossip together with the parents. Deok-sun reunites with her high school friends at the old tteokbokki shop, with Maggie having her first meeting with the girls in six years because she was in the US all the time for college. Dong-ryong's mother does not easily get used to being a housewife and grandmother, so she takes up a job as a cashier. Taek meets up with Jung-hwan at the Air Force base camp in Sacheon before leaving for multiple tournaments. In China, he is welcomed and taken care of Deok-sun, who stops over there because of her job. Taek is revealed many sensitive secrets in those two meetings. Dong-il perseveres through long working days, although he continuously tells his wife about his company's lucrative voluntary retirement plan. As his bank's senior employee, he is eventually forced to retire. He is at peace with his new life, but his employer does not show much gratitude towards him. Mi-ran is going through menopause and is having a hard time. Jung-bong commits to being a better houseman for his mother, and restarts his relationship with Maggie. When a wedding at Dong-ryong's place gets cancelled, the restaurateur gathers the street to his place for a barbecue on Mi-ran's birthday. To help her cope with her emotions, the party becomes a wedding anniversary for Mi-ran and Sung-kyun, and Dong-il too gets a surprise. Bo-ra and Sun-woo have restarted their relationship, and it soon becomes clear to the neighborhood that things have started to become serious.
20	"Goodbye, Youth, Goodbye, Ssangmun-dong"	Shin Won-ho	Lee Woo-jung	January 16, 2016
December 1994. Sun-woo tells Bo-ra he intends to marry the next year even though he has yet to finish medical school. When rumors go through the street, they confirm that intention to their parents. Marriage is hard to approve, however, because the two have the same surname. However, law changes allow them do formally do so. Sung-kyun and Mi-ran feel blessed having two sons that looked up to them instead of being ashamed when things were much tougher. They are proud of Jung-hwan, and support Jung-bong even though he has decided to quit college and start working at a nearby pub. Jung-bong meets Maggie's father, a renowned textile salesman who demands much from his daughter, as well as her boyfriend. The firstborn of the Kim family would go on to be a famous TV chef. The parents talk about their empty nest syndrome when their children leave their houses again, and about their plans to move out of the street. When Taek and Deok-sun go on a movie date, they get the inevitable media attention. The two confirm they are in love with each other and start dating regularly. Moo-sung reveals that Dong-il sent Deok-sun to the baduk association in an effort to improve her concentration at school, and Taek followed right behind her. Baduk was not a good match for Deok-sun, but Taek got so obsessed with the game, he became a professional player and the household's breadwinner when he was just a child. Moo-sung initially disapproved of his obsessive attitude towards the sport, but eventually supported him throughout his career, albeit silently and not visibly. Despite their many differences, Taek and Deok-sun have always been closely befriended, perhaps even more than with the other kids. Late 1995. Seven days before the marriage, preparations are well under way. The Sung households give their best advice to their eldest children, who will both continue to work after the wedding. Sun-woo approves of Moo-sung being his stepfather. Sun-woo and Bo-ra marry. When they leave for their honeymoon, Bo-ra and Dong-il trade letters to each other in appreciation. Bo-ra and Sun-woo are still happily together. Soon afterward, the families who have occupied the Ssangmun neighborhood for many years move out to live in more attractive residencies, never to see each other again. The blocks where they used to live and raise their children into adulthood are now vandalized, deserted and abandoned, ready to be demolished. The lively atmosphere that once occupied these buildings is now a distant memory, which the Ssangmun residents share with many Koreans of their age.

== Production ==
=== Pre-production ===
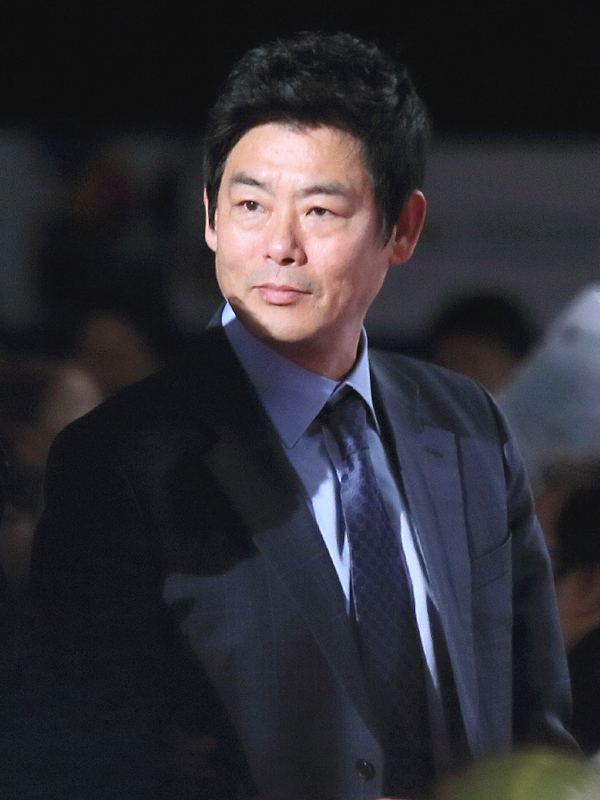
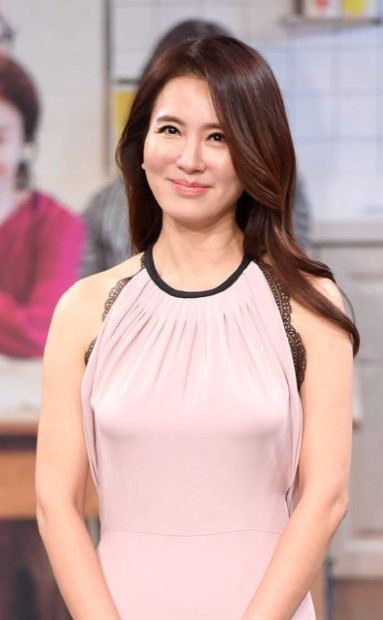
Actors Sung Dong-il and Lee Il-hwa play the parents of the female lead character in each installment of the Reply anthology series

Reply 1988 marked the third collaboration between director Shin Won-ho and screenwriter Lee Woo-jung. Unlike the previous Reply series, 1988 focuses more on filial bond than romance between characters with director Shin saying that most of the story was about family, but the mystery on the lead's husband, like the previous series, is still present.

=== Casting ===
In May 2015, Hyeri, Park Bo-gum and Go Kyung-pyo confirmed their appearances together with Ryu Jun-yeol, Ryu Hye-young and Ahn Jae-hong. Kim Sung-kyun, who co-starred in Reply 1994 also joined the cast together with Reply anthology series regulars Sung Dong-il and Lee Il-hwa.

=== Filming ===
On August 10, 2015, photos from the first script reading were revealed; principal photography commenced days later.

== Music ==
Like its predecessors, the soundtrack for Reply 1988 also consists of remakes of old songs.

=== Part 1 ===
No.	Title	Lyrics	Music	Original Singer	Length
1.	"Youth (청춘) (Rock Ver.)" (Kim Feel)	Kim Chang-wan	Kim Chang-wan	Sanulrim	4:27
2.	"Youth (청춘) (feat. Kim Chang-wan)" (Kim Feel)	Kim Chang-wan	Kim Chang-wan	Sanulrim	3:40

=== Part 2 ===
No.	Title	Lyrics	Music	Original Singer	Length
1.	"Don't Worry Dear (걱정말아요 그대)" (Lee Juck)	Jeon In-kwon	Jeon In-kwon	Jeon In-kwon	3:51

=== Part 3 ===
No.	Title	Lyrics	Music	Original Singer	Length
1.	"A Little Girl (소녀)" (Oh Hyuk)	Lee Young-hoon	Lee Young-hoon	Lee Moon-sae	3:33

=== Part 4 ===
No.	Title	Lyrics	Music	Original Singer	Length
1.	"Hyehwa-dong (or Ssangmun-dong) (혜화동 (혹은 쌍문동))" (Park Bo-ram)	Kim Chang-ki	Kim Chang-ki	Zoo	4:22

=== Part 5 ===
No.	Title	Lyrics	Music	Original Singer	Length
1.	"All I Have to Give You Is Love (네게 줄 수 있는건 오직 사랑뿐)" (December)	Ji Geun-sik	Ji Geun-sik	Byun Jin-sub	3:31

=== Part 6 ===
No.	Title	Lyrics	Music	Original Singer	Length
1.	"Violet Fragrance (보라빛향기)" (Wable)	Kang Susie	Yoon Sang	Kang Susie	3:44

=== Part 7 ===
No.	Title	Lyrics	Music	Original Singer	Length
1.	"Together (함께)" (Noel)	Do Yoon-kyung	Park Kwang-hyun	Park Kwang-hyun	4:33

=== Part 8 ===
No.	Title	Lyrics	Music	Original Singer	Length
1.	"Everyday With You (매일 그대와)" (Sojin (Girls' Day))	Choi Sung-won	Choi Sung-won	Deulgukhwa	3:16

=== Part 9 ===
No.	Title	Lyrics	Music	Original Singer	Length
1.	"As Time Goes By (세월이 가면)" (Kihyun)	Choi Myung-sub	Choi Gwi-sub	Choi Ho-sub	3:49

=== Part 10 ===
No.	Title	Lyrics	Music	Original Singer	Length
1.	"Let's Forget It (이젠 잊기로 해요)" (Yeo-eun (Melody Day))	Lee Jang-hee	Lee Jang-hee	Kim Wan-sun	3:58

=== Part 11 ===
No.	Title	Lyrics	Music	Original Singer	Length
1.	"기억날 그날이 와도" (NC.A)	Oh Tae-ho	Oh Tae-ho	Hong Song-min	3:45

== Reception ==
=== Critical response and impact ===
Reply 1988 received widespread critical and audience acclaim with its finale episode recording an 18.8% nationwide audience share making it the highest rated drama in Korean cable television history at the time of airing. It catapulted its cast to popularity inside and outside South Korea and its cable channel TvN shot to influence among broadcast networks. For the BBC, the series is a "television masterpiece" that has "ushered in South Korea's cable era" and "laid the groundwork for a swell of more realist and nostalgic Korean dramas" which subsequently gained international success. Per The Korea Times, "Reply 1988 wasn’t just popular — it was a cultural phenomenon, widely hailed as a 'National Drama'". The 1980s nostalgia brought by the series was widespread initiating the newtro boom in the country. The New Yorker attributed its "record-breaking success" to the series' "quirky humor, nostalgic lilt, and borderless perspective".

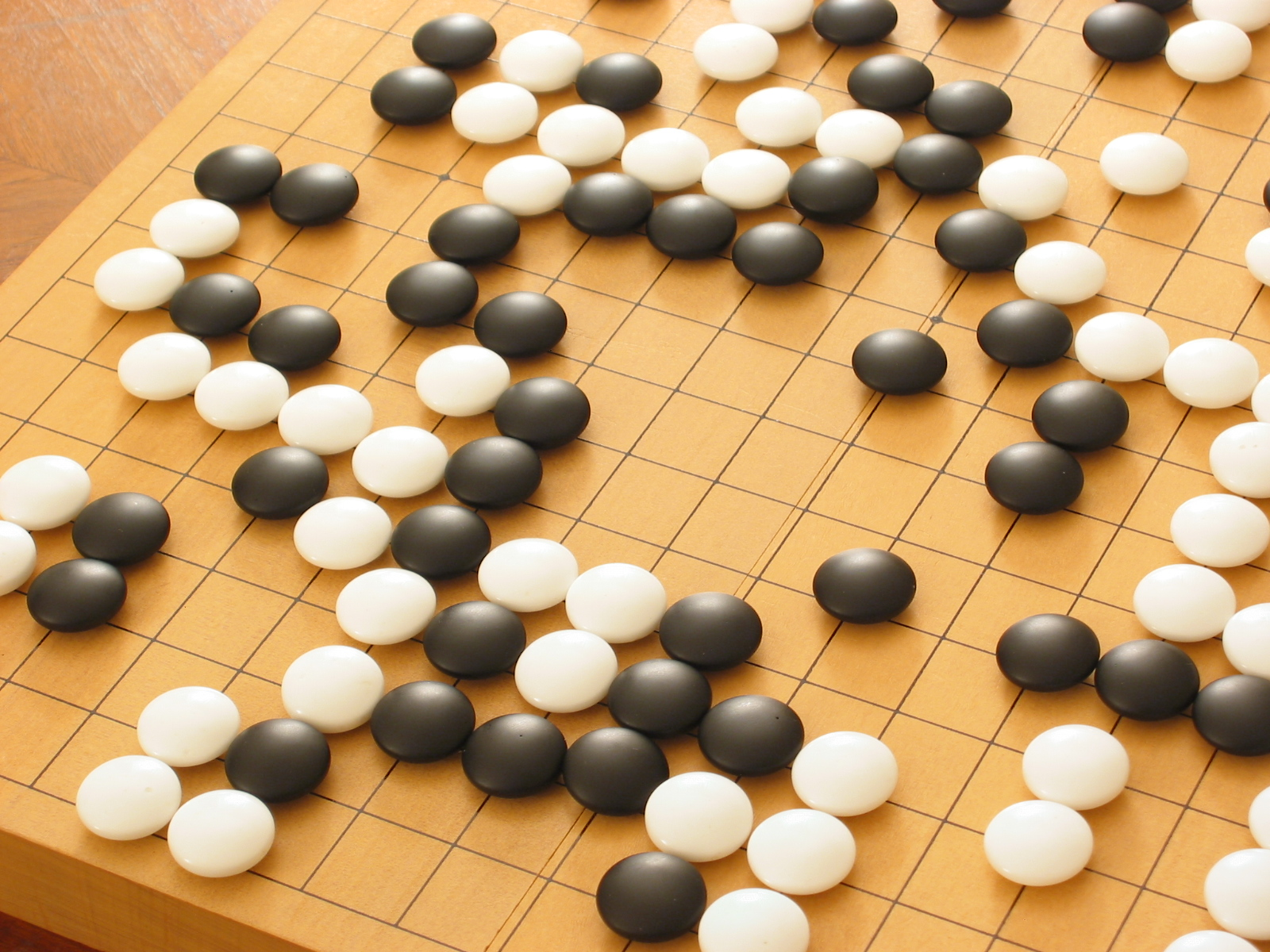
Baduk experienced heightened popularity inside and outside South Korea due to the character Choi Taek, played by Park Bo-gum, who is a professional baduk player

According to The Korean Herald, the series whetted the demand for retro goods and family values: "No less remarkable is the emotional bond the series managed to create between generations that are gradually drifting apart." Per TvN, advertisements and VOD sales alone raked in some ₩22.1 billion. Its soundtrack also dominated local music charts. A beer brand, which was stopped being produced in 1993, hit the shelves again after featuring in the series as were record players; 80s staples like long overcoats, flared pants, turtleneck knitwear also became the new trend in fashion. Baduk, which the character Choi Taek plays in the series, underwent a resurgence in popularity. The character is loosely based on real-life baduk player Lee Chang-ho and portrayed by Park Bo-gum. In Turkey, baduk experienced heightened popularity especially among female players: "According to the Turkish Go Players Association, the show led to an increase in hallyu fans who are interested in the game". The series streamed via IQIYI in China and was extremely well-received leading to Tencent Video purchasing the rights for a remake. However, due to the hallyu ban in China, an unofficial remake titled Our Youth was produced and broadcast instead.

The big data analytics firm Good Data Corporation reported that Reply 1988 ranked first in overall topicality making it the "Most Buzzworthy Program" (TV; Drama and Entertainment) for its entire run, and achieved the highest all-time percentage among programs with its finale recording a 48.2% share. Also reported by Good Data, Park Bo-gum recorded the highest all-time percentage as "Most Buzzworthy Performer" (TV; Drama and Entertainment) in television by the final episode, followed by Hyeri and Ryu Jun-yeol respectively.

=== Viewership ===
In this table, the blue numbers represent the lowest ratings and the red numbers represent the highest ratings.

Ep.	Original broadcast date	Title	Average audience share		
Ep.	Original broadcast date	Title	AGB Nielsen		TNmS
Ep.	Original broadcast date	Title	Nationwide	Seoul	Nationwide
1	November 6, 2015	Hand in Hand	6.118%	6.509%	6.5%
2	November 7, 2015	The One Thing You're Mistaken About Me	6.600%	7.600%	6.7%
3	November 13, 2015	Not Guilty If You're Rich, Guilty If You're Poor	7.777%	8.697%	8.6%
4	November 14, 2015	Can't help ~ing	7.800%	8.600%	8.0%
5	November 20, 2015	Ready for Winter	10.145%	10.282%	9.6%
6	November 21, 2015	The First Snow Is Coming	8.900%	9.800%	8.8%
7	November 27, 2015	To You	10.200%	11.200%	10.2%
8	November 28, 2015	One Warm Word	10.900%	11.100%	10.7%
9	December 4, 2015	Crossing The Line	11.563%	11.861%	10.2%
10	December 5, 2015	Memory	13.365%	13.793%	12.5%
11	December 11, 2015	Three Different Prophecies	12.228%	11.772%	12.3%
12	December 12, 2015	Loving Someone Means	13.060%	13.046%	11.8%
13	December 18, 2015	Superman Has Returned	12.858%	13.277%	12.2%
14	December 19, 2015	Don't Worry, Dear	15.133%	16.082%	13.2%
15	December 25, 2015	Between Love and Friendship	15.192%	16.834%	13.6%
16	December 26, 2015	Life is Ironic – 1	15.372%	15.771%	12.6%
17	January 8, 2016	Life is Ironic – 2	15.472%	16.005%	15.5%
18	January 9, 2016	Goodbye, My First Love	17.191%	18.615%	16.2%
19	January 15, 2016	You Did Your Best	17.597%	19.368%	17.9%
20	January 16, 2016	Goodbye, Youth; Goodbye, Ssangmun-dong	18.803%	19.421%	18.4%
Average			12.314%	12.982%	11.775%
0	October 30, 2015	Guide	2.996%	–	–
Special	January 2, 2016	Behind	7.021%	–	6.7%

- This drama airs on a cable channel/pay TV which normally has a relatively smaller audience compared to free-to-air TV/public broadcasters (KBS, SBS, MBC and EBS).
- The series set a record by receiving over 200 million cumulative views within a month of its official online premiere in China.

== Accolades ==
Name of the award ceremony, year presented, category, nominee of the award, and the result of the nomination
Year	Award	Category	Recipient	Result	Ref.
2016	16th Top Chinese Music Awards	Best International Artist	Park Bo-gum	Won	
2016	52nd Baeksang Arts Awards	Best Drama	Reply 1988	Nominated	
2016	52nd Baeksang Arts Awards	Best Director	Shin Won-ho	Won	
2016	52nd Baeksang Arts Awards	Best Actress	Ra Mi-ran	Nominated	
2016	52nd Baeksang Arts Awards	Best New Actor	Ryu Jun-yeol	Won	
2016	52nd Baeksang Arts Awards	Best New Actor	Ahn Jae-hong	Nominated	
2016	52nd Baeksang Arts Awards	Best New Actor	Lee Dong-hwi	Nominated	
2016	52nd Baeksang Arts Awards	Best New Actress	Ryu Hye-young	Nominated	
2016	52nd Baeksang Arts Awards	Best New Actress	Lee Hye-ri	Nominated	
2016	52nd Baeksang Arts Awards	Best Screenplay	Lee Woo-jung	Nominated	
2016	4th Annual DramaFever Awards	Best Rising Star	Park Bo-gum	Won	
2016	4th Annual DramaFever Awards	Best Kiss	Park Bo-gum & Lee Hye-ri	Won	
2016	11th Seoul International Drama Awards	Best Miniseries	Reply 1988	Nominated	
2016	5th APAN Star Awards	Best Director	Shin Won-ho	Won	
2016	5th APAN Star Awards	Best Supporting Actor	Choi Moo-sung	Nominated	
2016	5th APAN Star Awards	Best Supporting Actress	Kim Sun-young	Nominated	
2016	5th APAN Star Awards	Best New Actor	Park Bo-gum	Won	
2016	5th APAN Star Awards	Best New Actress	Lee Hye-ri	Won	
2016	9th Korea Drama Awards	Top Excellence Award, Actor	Park Bo-gum	Nominated	
2016	9th Korea Drama Awards	Best New Actor	Ahn Jae-hong	Nominated	
2016	9th Korea Drama Awards	Best New Actor	Lee Dong-hwi	Nominated	
2016	9th Korea Drama Awards	Best New Actress	Lee Hye-ri	Nominated	
2016	9th Korea Drama Awards	Best Original Soundtrack	Lee Juck ("Don't Worry Dear")	Nominated	
2016	tvN10 Awards	Grand Prize (Daesang), Drama	Reply 1988	Won	
2016	tvN10 Awards	Best Content Award, Drama	Reply 1988	Won	
2016	tvN10 Awards	Best Actor	Sung Dong-il	Nominated	
2016	tvN10 Awards	Special Acting Award	Sung Dong-il	Won	
2016	tvN10 Awards	Asia Star Award	Park Bo-gum	Won	
2016	tvN10 Awards	Rising Star Award, Actor	Ryu Jun-yeol	Won	
2016	tvN10 Awards	Rising Star Award, Actress	Lee Hye-ri	Won	
2016	tvN10 Awards	Scene-Stealer, Actor	Kim Sung-kyun	Won	
2016	tvN10 Awards	Scene-Stealer, Actor	Lee Dong-hwi	Nominated	
2016	tvN10 Awards	Scene-Stealer, Actress	Ra Mi-ran	Won	
2016	tvN10 Awards	Scene-Stealer, Actress	Kim Sun-young	Nominated	
2016	tvN10 Awards	Scene-Stealer, Actress	Lee Il-hwa	Nominated	
2016	tvN10 Awards	Scene-Stealer, Actress	Ryu Hye-young	Nominated	
2016	tvN10 Awards	Made in tvN, Actor in Drama	Park Bo-gum	Nominated	
2016	tvN10 Awards	Made in tvN, Actor in Drama	Ryu Jun-yeol	Nominated	
2016	tvN10 Awards	Made in tvN, Actress in Drama	Lee Hye-ri	Nominated	
2016	tvN10 Awards	Two Star Award	Go Kyung-pyo	Nominated	
2016	tvN10 Awards	Best Kiss	Park Bo-gum & Lee Hye-ri	Nominated	
2016	8th Melon Music Awards	Best OST	Oh Hyuk ("A Little Girl")	Nominated	
2016	18th Mnet Asian Music Awards	Best OST	Lee Juck ("Don't Worry Dear")	Won	
2016	1st Asia Artist Awards	Best Rookie Award, Actor	Ryu Jun-yeol	Won	
2016	1st Asia Artist Awards	Asia Star Award, Actor	Park Bo-gum	Won	

== 10th anniversary ==
To commemorate the series' 10th anniversary, 15 cast members including Lee Hye-ri, Park Bo-gum, Go Kung-pyo, and Lee Dong-hwi as well as Reply series director Shin Won-ho and writer Lee Woo-jung participated in a reunion variety show in Gangwon Province in October 2025. It was directed by Na Yeong-seok and Shin Gun-joon, and was broadcast on TvN starting December 19, 2025 for a total of three episodes.

== See also ==
- Reply 1997
- Reply 1994
