= Ssangmun-dong =

- Neighbourhood
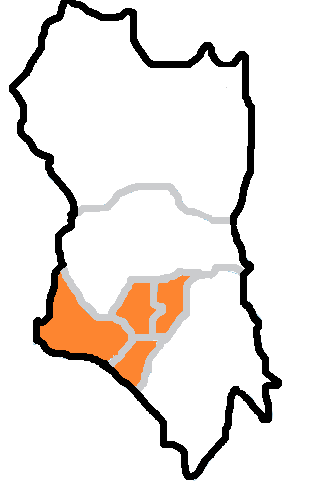
- Country: South Korea

Area
  - Total: 2.81 km^{2} (1.08 sq mi)

Population (2010)
  - Total: 84,893
  - Density: 30,200/km^{2} (78,200/sq mi)

Korean name
- Hangul: 쌍문동
- Hanja: 雙門洞
- RR: Ssangmun-dong
- MR: Ssangmun-dong

Ssangmun-dong (Korean: 쌍문동; IPA: [s͈aŋmundoŋ]) is a dong (neighborhood) of Dobong District, Seoul, South Korea.

== Name ==
The name of the neighbourhood literally means two doors and originated from the fact the region used to have two yeolnyeomun—a special door awarded to a yeolnyeo (or "virtuous woman").

== In popular culture ==
The location has been used in many South Korean shows because the area was once home to a lot of old buildings and alleyways, and is characterised as a place where rather impoverished people live. This makes it easier for writers to establish "rags to riches" stories and to communicate a sense of warmth to the audience and a place with nostalgic quality. The location was popularized internationally by the 2015 Korean drama Reply 1988 and the 2021 Netflix series Squid Game, where it was the home of Seong Gi-hun and his childhood friend Cho Sang-woo.

- Dooly the Little Dinosaur
- Old Miss Diary
- Reply 1988
- Squid Game
- The Bathhouse People
- Yeongsimi
