= B.I videography =

B.I video discography
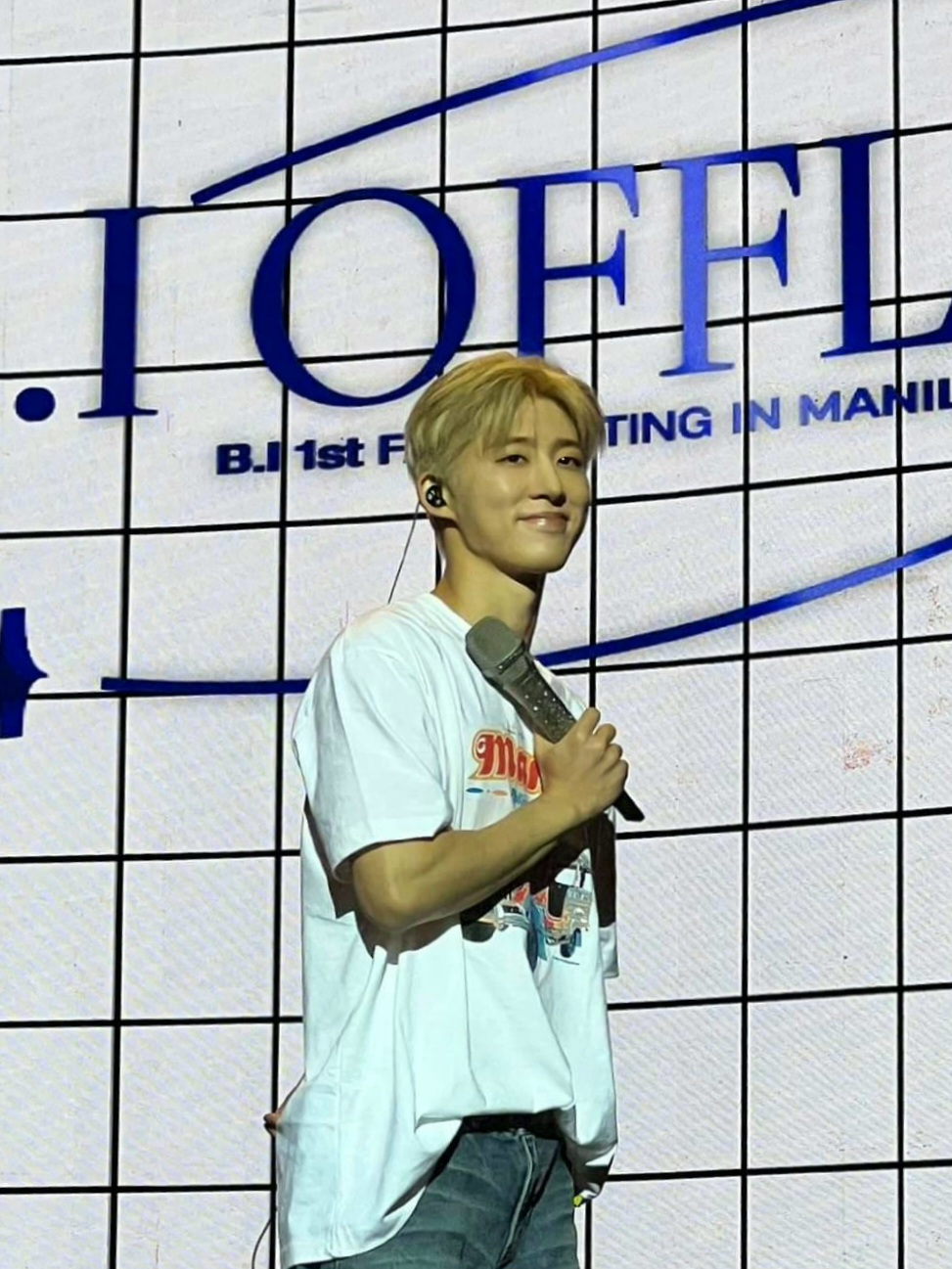
- B.I at his first fan meeting in Manila in August 2022
- Music videos: 27
- Other music videos: 15

The videography of South Korean artist B.I.

== Music videos ==
=== As lead artist ===
Legend
Denotes single

Song title	Year	Album	Director	Description	Ref.
"Midnight Blue" (깊은 밤의 위로)	2021	Midnight Blue (Love Streaming)	Voeun	Animation-based music visual.	
"Got It Like That" (with Destiny Rogers, and Tyla Yaweh)	2021	Non-album single	Seokyoung Yoon (Mother Media)	Official music video. With Destiny Rogers and Tyla Yaweh.	
"Waterfall"	2021	Waterfall	Mother Media	Live music visual.	
"Waterfall"	2021	Waterfall	Mother Media	Official music video – "performance version". Performance-oriented music visual. The video shows a choreography created by Youngbeen.	
"Illa Illa" (해변)	2021	Waterfall	Woogie Kim (Mother Media)	Official music video.	
"Illa Illa" (해변)	2021	Waterfall	Unknown	Performance-oriented music visual. The video shows a choreography created by Lee Han-sol, Yu Jung-wan and Kinjaz.	
"Illa Illa" (해변) (piano ver.)	2021	Waterfall	Unknown	Live-action music visual.	
"Daydream" (긴 꿈) (with Lee Hi)	2021	Waterfall	Unknown	Live-action music visual.	
"Illusion" (꿈결)	2021	Waterfall	Mirai Mono; Kitz Graphy	Animation-based music visual.	
"Re-Birth" (다음 생)	2021	Waterfall	Unknown	Documentary-based lyric video.	
"Remember Me" (역겹겠지만)	2021	Waterfall	Unknown	Live music visual.	
"Lost At Sea (Illa Illa 2)" (with Bipolar Sunshine, and Afgan)	2021	Non-album single	Unknown	Photo album-based lyric video.	
"Cosmos"	2021	Cosmos	Woogie Kim (Mother Media)	Official music video.	
"Cosmos"	2021	Cosmos	Unknown	Live music visual.	
"Nineteen" (열아홉)	2021	Cosmos	AFF	Official music video.	
"BTBT" (featuring DeVita)	2022	Love or Loved Part.1	Lee Su-ho (Boring Studios)	Official music video – "story version". Live-action music visual set in a futuristic city.	
"BTBT" (featuring DeVita)	2022	Love or Loved Part.1	Spring Kim	Live music visual.	
"BTBT" (with Soulja Boy, featuring DeVita)	2022	Love or Loved Part.1	Damian	Abstract animation-based lyric video.	
"BTBT" (with Soulja Boy, featuring DeVita)	2022	Love or Loved Part.1	Cho Na-lim	Official music video – "performance version". Performance-oriented music visual. The video shows a choreography created by Aitty Too (Youngbeen, Shawn, Jinwoo, Tarzan, Beom).	
"Lullaby" (자장가) (with Chuu)	2022	Non-album single	Hyo9	Live music visual. With Chuu.	
"Keep Me Up"	2022	Love or Loved Part.1	Cho Na-lim	Official music video. Performance-oriented music visual, seemingly set in the same futuristic city as the official music video for "BTBT" (story version). The video shows a choreography created by Youngbeen, Shawn and Beom.	
"Keep Me Up"	2022	Love or Loved Part.1	Spring Kim	Live music visual.	
"Middle with You"	2022	Love or Loved Part.1	Spring Kim	Live music visual.	
"Middle with You"	2022	Love or Loved Part.1	Unknown	Vertical live-action lyric video.	
"Tangerine"	2022	Love or Loved Part.1	Spring Kim	Live music visual.	
"Endless Summer"	2022	Love or Loved Part.1	Spring Kim	Live music visual.	
"TTM" (with Sik-K, Reddy)	2023	Non-album single	Choi Chang-hwi	Official music video. The video shows B.I, Sik-K and Reddy performing the song in a junkyard-like setting.	
"Loved"	2023	Love or Loved Part.2	Byul Yun	Official music video.	
"Wish You Were Here"	2024	Tadaima (ただいま)	Aedia Studio	Official music video.	

=== As featured artist ===
Song title	Year	Director	Ref.
"Indian Boy" (MC Mong featuring Jang-geun, and B.I)	2009	Unknown	
"Born Hater" (Epik High featuring Beenzino, Verbal Jint, B.I, Mino, and Bobby)	2014	Digipedi	
"No One" (누구 없소) (Lee Hi featuring B.I)	2019	Han Sa-min	
"Savior" (구원자) (Lee Hi featuring B.I)	2021	Hong Min-ho (Studio Achilles)	
"Handsome" (Padi featuring B.I, Nucksal, Kid Milli, and Gaeko)	2022	Kwonee (ESVP)	
"Jacuzzi" (James Reid, B.I, and DJ Flict)	2023	Hiromi Uematsu	
"INFJ" (Big Naughty featuring B.I, and Bang Ye-dam)	2023	Mingi Kang (Aarch Film)	
"Pretty Plzzz" (Leo featuring B.I)	2024	Unknown	

=== Cameo appearances ===
Song title	Year	Director	Ref.
"Horror Show" (MC Mong featuring Kang Ho-dong, and Whale)	2009	Unknown	

== Other music videos ==
Video title	Year	Album	Director	Description	Ref.
Waterfall intro film	2021	Waterfall	Mother Media	Short live-action music trailer. Medley of "Re-Birth" and "Waterfall".	
"Numb" track film	2021	Waterfall	AFF	One short live-action music trailer for each track of Waterfall, except "Waterfall" and "Illa Illa".	
"Illusion" (꿈결) track film	2021	Waterfall	AFF	One short live-action music trailer for each track of Waterfall, except "Waterfall" and "Illa Illa".	
"Remember Me" (역겹겠지만) track film	2021	Waterfall	AFF	One short live-action music trailer for each track of Waterfall, except "Waterfall" and "Illa Illa".	
"Stay" (with Tablo) track film	2021	Waterfall	AFF	One short live-action music trailer for each track of Waterfall, except "Waterfall" and "Illa Illa".	
"Gray" (비 온 뒤 흐림) track film	2021	Waterfall	AFF	One short live-action music trailer for each track of Waterfall, except "Waterfall" and "Illa Illa".	
"Daydream" (긴 꿈) (with Lee Hi) track film	2021	Waterfall	Yeom Woo-jin	One short live-action music trailer for each track of Waterfall, except "Waterfall" and "Illa Illa".	
"Flow Away" track film	2021	Waterfall	Yeom Woo-jin	One short live-action music trailer for each track of Waterfall, except "Waterfall" and "Illa Illa".	
"Help Me" track film	2021	Waterfall	Yeom Woo-jin	One short live-action music trailer for each track of Waterfall, except "Waterfall" and "Illa Illa".	
"Then" (그땐 내가) track film	2021	Waterfall	Yeom Woo-jin	One short live-action music trailer for each track of Waterfall, except "Waterfall" and "Illa Illa".	
"Re-Birth" (다음 생) track film	2021	Waterfall	Yeom Woo-jin	One short live-action music trailer for each track of Waterfall, except "Waterfall" and "Illa Illa".	
1st Cosmos message film: Keep the Fire Alive	2021	Cosmos	Kim In-tae (AFF)	Performance music trailer. Medley of "Alive" and "Flame". The video shows the choreography created by Youngbeen for the song "Flame".	
2nd Cosmos message film: Uncertainty, the Beauty of Youth	2021	Cosmos	Lee Hye-in	Live-action music trailer. Medley of "Nineteen", "Lover", "Nerd" and "Cosmos".	
131 Playlist: 일요일 저녁도 몽글몽글할 수 있다고요?	2022	N/A	Unknown	Live-action music visual. 14 released songs and 3 demos.	
To Die For episode film	2023	To Die For	Nany Kim	Short film made up of nine episodes, telling the troubled love story of two young people. B.I plays the male lead. Each episode introduces one of the nine new songs of his second full length album.	

== See also ==
- iKon videography
