= The Stereotypes =

Production team

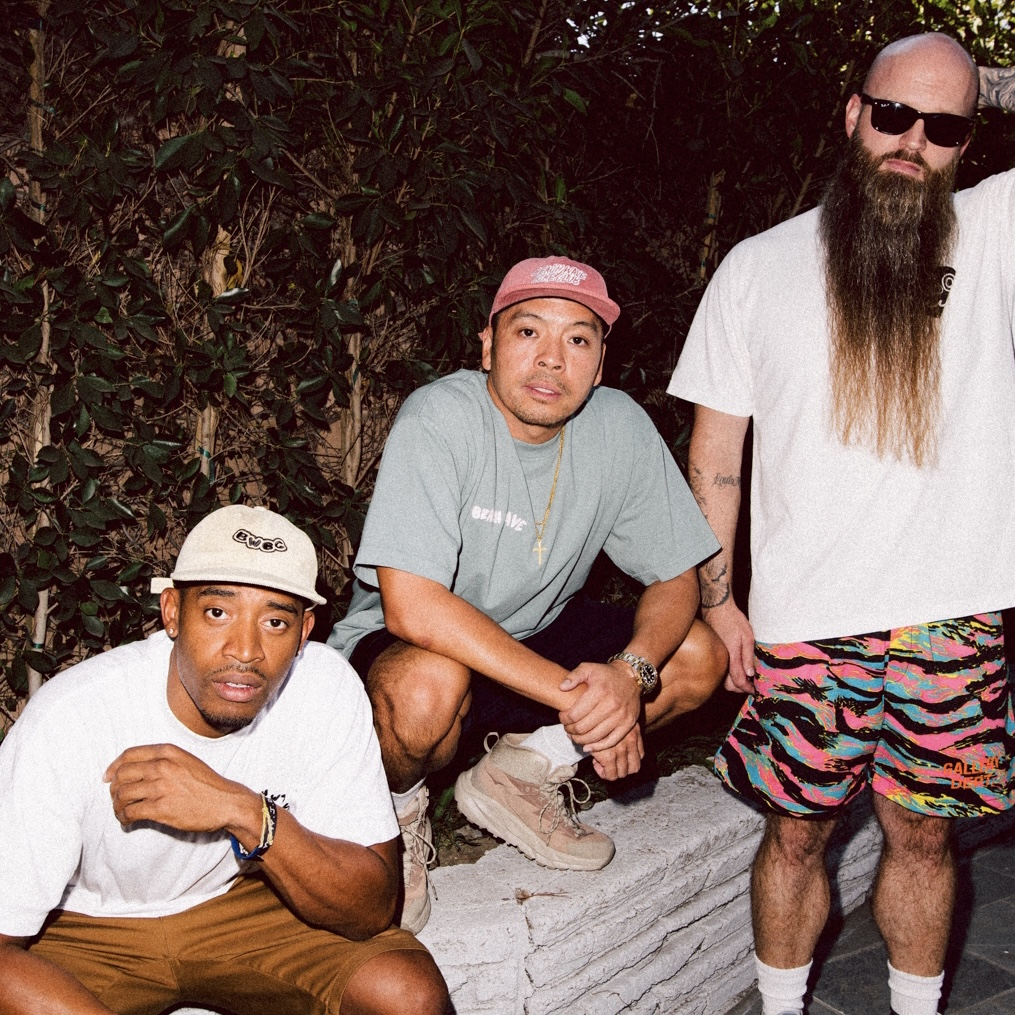

Background information
- Genres: R&B; hip hop; dance; pop
- Years active: 2003–present
- Members: Jonathan Yip; Ray Romulus; Jeremy Reeves; Ray Charles McCullough II
- Website: stereotypesonline.com

The Stereotypes are an American music production team, formed in 2003 and composed of Jonathan Yip, Ray Romulus, Jeremy Reeves and Ray Charles McCullough II. In June 2010, they were listed among the "Top 10 Songwriters and Producers to Watch" in Billboard magazine.

The Stereotypes have been credited on commercially successful singles such as Justin Bieber's "Somebody to Love", Cardi B and Bruno Mars "Please Me", Sexyy Red and Bruno Mars "Fat Juicy and Wet", Ne-Yo's "Year of the Gentleman", Mary J. Blige's "Good Love", Chris Brown's "Beg for It", Fifth Harmony's "Deliver", Lil Yachty's "Better" and Iggy Azalea's "Mo Bounce".

The Stereotypes won two Grammy Awards in 2018, Song of the Year and Best R&B Song, for their contributions to Bruno Mars's Billboard Hot 100-number one single "That's What I Like". The Stereotypes took over the charts in 2017 with several credits on Mars' album 24K Magic, which swept the Grammys, winning Album of the Year, Best R&B Album and Best Engineered Album, Non-Classical at the 60th Annual Grammy Awards. The Stereotypes co-wrote and produced its lead single "24K Magic" (which won the award for Record of the Year), "That's What I Like" and "Finesse". They were also nominated for Producer of the Year (Non-Classical).

== Production credits ==
=== Singles ===
Year	Single	Artist	Album
2007	"Wonderful"	Marques Houston	Veteran
2008	"Damaged"	Danity Kane	Welcome to the Dollhouse
2008	"6 am"	"Bueno" feat. Bruno Mars	Can't Knock the Hustle
2008	"Why Just Be Friends"	Joe	Joe Thomas, New Man
2009	"Good Love"	Mary J. Blige feat. T.I.	Stronger With Each Tear
2009	"Beautiful People"	Nina Sky	Starting Today
2010	"Girls on the Dance Floor" feat. Stereotypes	Far*East Movement	Free Wired
2010	"Rocketeer" feat. Ryan Tedder	Far*East Movement	Free Wired
2010	"If I Was You (OMG)" feat. Snoop Dogg	Far*East Movement	Free Wired
2010	"So What?"	Far*East Movement	Free Wired
2010	"Even Angels"	Fantasia Barrino	Back To Me
2010	"I Don't Care"	Raheem DeVaughn	The Love & War MasterPeace
2010	"We'll Be Alright"	Travie McCoy	Lazarus
2010	"Somebody to Love"	Justin Bieber	My World 2.0
2010	"Somebody to Love Remix" feat. Usher	Justin Bieber	My World 2.0
2010	"Celebration"	Tank feat. Drake	Now or Never
2011	"Starbucks Smile"	Maria K	RadioWaves
2011	"Dat Good"	"Bueno"	Untitled
2012	"Lego"	JON MCXRO	The Fifth of Never
2012	"Kiss It Bye Bye"	Aleesia feat. Big Sean	"Kiss It Bye Bye" (single)
2012	"The Boom"	T. Mills	Leaving Home EP
2012	"Dirty Bass" feat. Tyga	Far East Movement	Dirty Bass
2012	"Sun Burns Down"	Jin Akanishi	Japonicana
2013	"Where To Land" feat. III	Travis Garland	Fashionably Late Vol. 2
2013	"Motel Pool"	Travis Garland	Fashionably Late Vol. 2
2013	"Clouds"	Travis Garland	Fashionably Late Vol. 2
2013	"Blue Electric Roses"	Travis Garland	Fashionably Late Vol. 2
2014	"Lemonade"	Danity Kane	DK3
2014	"One More Time"	Nick & Knight	"One More Time" (single)
2015	"I'm Sayin'" (feat. Rich Homie Quan)	Omarion	I'm Sayin' (single)
2015	"Kiss My Lips"	BoA	Kiss My Lips
2015	"Devil"	Super Junior	Devil
2015	"That's What's Up"	Skylar Stecker	"That's What's Up" (single)
2016	"Before I Do"	Sevyn Streeter	Girl Disrupted
2016	"24K Magic"	Bruno Mars	24K Magic
2017	"That's What I Like"	Bruno Mars	24K Magic
2017	"Mo Bounce"	Iggy Azalea	Digital Distortion
2017	"Jungle"	Pitbull feat. Stereotypes, E-40 & Abraham Mateo	Pitbull Greatest Hits
2018	"Finesse (Remix)"	Bruno Mars feat. Cardi B	24K Magic
2018	"Bad Boy"	Red Velvet	The Perfect Red Velvet
2018	"Sit Next To Me (Stereotypes Remix)"	Foster The People	Sacred Hearts Club
2018	"Light Flex (feat. 2 Chainz)"	Tone Stith	Uncle Drew Original Soundtrack
2018	"Got Friends (feat. Miguel)"	GoldLink	Got Friends (SINGLE)
2019	"Stay Long Love You"	Mariah Carey	Caution
2019	"Please Me"	Cardi B feat. Bruno Mars	Please Me
2019	"Tomboy"	Destiny Rogers	Tomboy (single)
2019	"Don't Threaten Me With a Good Time"	Thomas Rhett feat. Little Big Town	Center Point Road
2019	"Too Loud"	G-Eazy (feat. Nef The Pharaoh)	B-Sides
2019	"Gucci Pajamas (feat. Chance the Rapper & Charlie Wilson)"	Guapdad 4000	Dior Deposits
2019	"Lo Lo (feat. P-Lo & GuapDad 4000)"	Destiny Rogers	Lo Lo (single)
2019	"How Did You Get Here"	Celine Dion	Courage
2019	"Euphoria"	Destiny Rogers	Euphoria (single)
2020	"Forever Valentine"	Charlie Wilson	Forever Valentine (single)
2020	"Kickin' Pushin'"	Destiny Rogers	Great Escape EP
2020	"On 11"	Destiny Rogers	Great Escape EP
2020	"Hello"	Amine (feat. Luke Steele)	"Hello" (Single)
2021	"A Little More (feat. Kiana Lede)"	G-Eazy	A Little More (single)
2021	"Que Wea"	Paloma Mami	Sueños de Dalí
2021	"Tomboy" (feat. Coi Leray)	Destiny Rogers	Tomboy (SINGLE)
2021	"West Like" (feat. Kalan. FrFr)	Destiny Rogers	West Like (SINGLE)
2021	"Got It like That"	B.I, Destiny Rogers, Tyla Yaweh	Got It like That (SINGLE)
2021	"What I Like"	Destiny Rogers	What I Like (SINGLE)
2021	"Simon Say" (feat. Flo Milli)	Destiny Rogers	Simon Say (SINGLE)
2021	"Coastin'"	Victoria Monét	Coastin' (SINGLE)
2021	"Clocked Out"	Audrey Nuna (feat. NIKI)	Shang Chi and The Legend of The Ten Rings: The Album
2021	"Moonlight"	Twice	Formula of Love: O+T=<3
2021	"The Feels" (The Stereotypes Remix)	Twice	The Feels (SINGLE)
2021	"After Last Night"	Silk Sonic	An Evening With Silk Sonic
2022	"Target"	Shenseea (feat. Tyga)	Alpha
2022	"BTBT"	B.I, Soulja Boy, feat. DeVita	Love or Loved Part.1
2022	"Wish Upon A Star"	Kalan.FrFr	222
2022	"No Stoppin" (feat. Blxst)	Kalan.FrFr	222
2022	"On U"	Tai Verdes	HDTV
2022	u & i	James Reid	u & I (single)
2022	"Summer Nights"	Destiny Rogers	Summer Nights (single)
2022	"Keep Me Up"	B.I	Love or Loved Part.1
2022	"Fall Back"	Destiny Rogers	Fall Back (single)
2023	"Replay"	Jozzy	Songs For Women, Free Game For Niggas
2023	"Save My Love"	Destiny Rogers	Save My Love (single)
2023	"Still Your Girl"	Destiny Rogers	Still Your Girl (single)
2023	"One Look"	LEO	One Look (single)
2023	"Gum"	Jessi	Gum (single)
2023	"What's Love"	Diddy	The Love Albu dim: Off The Grid
2023	"Creep"	Kalan FrFr	NOT HARD 2 UNDERSTAND (EP)
2023	"Superman"	Charlie Wilson	Superman (single)
2024	"Make Up"	Destiny Rogers	Make Up (single)
2024	"3 Days"	Steve Aoki (ft. Kalan FrFr)	3 Days (single)
2024	"Zombie"	Everglow	Zombie
2024	"Strings"	Capella Grey (feat. French Montana & Fivio Foreign)	Strings (single)
2024	"Might Just"	Sweet Revenge	Might Just (single)
2024	"Squeeze"	Latto	Sugar Honey Iced Tea
2024	"Wait"	Hyolyn	Wait (single)
2024	"Bruninho's Theme Song"	Bruno Mars	Bruninho's Theme Song (single)
2025	"Fat Juicy and Wet"	Sexyy Red & Bruno Mars	Fat Juicy and Wet (single)
2025	"Bonde do Brunão"	Bruno Mars	Bonde do Brunão (single)
2025	"No Exes"	Lu Kala	No Tears On This Ride (EP)
2025	"Shoot"	no na	shoot (single)
2025	"Falling in Love"	no na	superstitious/falling in love (single)
2025	"Aftertaste"	Rosemarie	Aftertaste (single)
2025	"Dogg 'Em"	Jozzy	Dogg 'Em (single)
2025	"SHOTTY"	HYOLYN	SHOTTY (single)
2025	"Mi"	Mariah Carey	Here For It All
2025	"Time Will Tell"	Celeste	Time Will Tell (Single)
2026	"Back and Forth"	Kehlani & Missy Elliott	Back and Forth (Single)
2026	"Bed"	AND2BLE	Sequence 01: Curiousity
2026	"Sugar Rush"	AND2BLE	Sequence 01: Curiousity
2026	"Curious"	AND2BLE	Sequence 01: Curiousity
2026	"Bad"	Taeyang	Quintessence
2026	"Movie"	Taeyang	Quintessence
2026	"Now"	Taeyang	Quintessence
2026	"Check"	Hyolyn	OriginaLyn
2026	"Chat"	GIRLSET	Chat (Single)
2026	"Privacy"	Pitbull & Jason Derulo	Privacy (Single)

== Awards and nominations ==
=== Grammy Awards ===
Year	Nominee / work	Award	Result
2009	Year of the Gentleman	Album of the Year	Nominated
2009	Year of the Gentleman	Best Contemporary R&B Album	Nominated
2011	The Love & War Masterpeace	Best R&B Album	Nominated
2011	Back to Me	Best R&B Album	Nominated
2011	My World 2.0	Best Pop Vocal Album	Nominated
2012	F.A.M.E.	Best R&B Album	Won
2018	The Stereotypes	Producer of the Year, Non-Classical	Nominated
2018	"That's What I Like" (Bruno Mars song)	Best R&B Song	Won
2018	"That's What I Like" (Bruno Mars song)	Song of the Year	Won

=== Korean Music Awards ===
Year	Nominee / work	Award	Result
2018	"Bad Boy" (Red Velvet song)	Best Pop Song	Nominated
