= Waterfall (B.I album) =

- Digital cover

Studio album by B.I
- Released: June 1, 2021
- Studio: Titan Recording Studio, Seoul, South Korea
- Genre: Hip-hop; R&B
- Length: 40:07
- Language: Korean
- Label: IOK Music; 131 Label
- Producer: B.I

B.I chronology
Midnight Blue (Love Streaming) (2021)	Waterfall (2021)	Cosmos (2021)

Singles from Waterfall
- 1. "Re-Birth" Released: April 15, 2021; 2. "Illa Illa" Released: June 1, 2021

Vinyl LP cover

Waterfall is the debut studio album, and the second charity album by South Korean rapper, singer, songwriter, record producer and dancer B.I. It was released on June 1, 2021, by IOK Music X 131 Label, and distributed by Dreamus. The album contains 12 songs including the lead single "Illa Illa", all written and co-composed by B.I. Waterfall tells a condensed story of B.I's year-and-a-half-long hiatus from his perspective.

Waterfall is B.I's second donation project, the first being Midnight Blue (Love Streaming), with all of the copyright fees, music and album sales, and content revenue generated after the album's release being donated to the emergency relief of "Basic for Girls", conducted by the International Relief Development (NGO) World Vision. The "Basic for Girls" project aims to improve women's restroom facilities in Zambia, Africa, and provide sanitary napkins to support women's health.

== Background ==
On May 7, 2021, 131 Label announced the release schedule for the highly anticipated comeback of B.I as a solo artist, 6 years after debuting as the leader of iKon. This included a global single, "Got It Like That", featuring Destiny Rogers and Tyla Yaweh (released on May 14, 2021), and his first full-length album, Waterfall (released on June 1, 2021). The 12-track full-length record, Waterfall, is written and composed by B.I, with collaborations from other producers on compositions and arrangements. The album features K-pop vocalist Lee Hi (on "Daydream") and rapper Tablo of Epik High (on "Stay"). A cinematic music video for the title track "illa illa" was also released alongside the album.

"I wrote the song wishing that it could provide comfort to those that listen to it. Everyone has their own struggles whether it be with relationships, work, family, loneliness," B.I stated of "Illa Illa" in a press release. "As much as it can seem difficult at the time, there is a beach in the distance. To remember that every chapter that closes just means that a new chapter is about to begin."

"This album is an expression of my past, my present and my future. That every ending has a new beginning," said B.I speaking about Waterfall in an interview.

== Release and promotion ==
All the promotions before the release were handled through the social media accounts of 131 Label and IOK Music. On May 17, 2021, at midnight KST, B.I's team released a detailed "plan poster" that outlined what fans can expect in the weeks leading up to his comeback. This included a live film and performance film for the intro track of the album titled "Waterfall" and short video teaser films for all the other 10 tracks in the album, excluding the title track. In addition, title and concept posters, a lyric mood film, and an M/V spoiler commentary video were released for the title track "illa illa". B.I then held a live broadcast via YouTube, 1 hour prior to the new album release.

The album was released to digital music and streaming platforms on June 1, 2021, along with the music video for "illa illa". The album's CDs were made available for pre-order prior to the album release, and were released on June 1, 2021, as well. Two different versions of the CDs are available, Waterfall and Seaside.

On July 5, officially imported edition of Waterfall CDs were released in Japan, with official Japanese lyrics. Two different versions of the CDs are available, Waterfall and Seaside.

On August 11, 131 Label announced a limited edition LP. The pre-order period started on August 13, 2021, and ended on August 22, 2021. The LP was officially released on December 22, 2021.

On October 3, 2021, B.I held his first-ever concert, titled "131 Live Presents: B.I First Online Concert", during which he gave a live performance of all the songs from Waterfall.

== Philanthropy ==
On September 17, 2021, it was reported that B.I has pledged to donate all the proceeds of the generated music and copyright fees, not only from his single album Midnight Blue (Love Streaming), but also from his first full-length album Waterfall to World Vision (a humanitarian aid, development, and advocacy organization). B.I decided to conduct a "monthly donation project", and set up a detailed plan to continuously donate the entire amount of copyright fees, music and album sales, and content revenue generated after the release of the albums, up to 60 years after his death.

This donation will be donated to the "Basic for Girls" project, a project that aims to improve the poor environment, such as the construction of women's restrooms for women's human rights in Zambia, Africa, and support for sanitary napkins.

== Critical reception ==
Professional ratings
Review scores
Source	Rating
NME	4/5 stars

NME praised the album Waterfall, stating "B.I may have once reached his lowest, but this self-proclaimed waterfall has since been able to smoothen out the ground beneath him and start anew, from creating his own label to making a triumphant return to the music scene with Waterfall. Though he does not claim to be a one-man island; in the songs, there is also an underlying sense of gratitude and appreciation for those who supported and stood by him."

Time magazine included B.I's title track, "Illa Illa", on its list of "The Best K-Pop Songs of 2021 So Far", stating "with the breadth and depth of emotions he conveys, B.I. shows he's as much a storyteller as he is a songwriter." Time also picked the album, Waterfall, as one of the ten best K-pop albums of 2021.

"Illa Illa" was featured on Teen Vogue's "Best New Music Friday" for the week of June 4, 2021. MTV News included the single in its "Bop Shop" selection for the same week, calling it a song "about beaches" that "is definitely not your classic Song of the Summer," as the track "balances melancholy, emotional lyrics with an upbeat melody bound to get stuck in your head." The intro track "Waterfall", where B.I "explores the benefits of owning up and moving on," was also listed among the publication's favorite K-pop B-sides of 2021.

== Commercial performance ==
In South Korea, Waterfall debuted at No. 6 on the Gaon Album Chart. In Japan, the album debuted at No. 8 on the Billboard Japan download albums chart, No. 16 on Oricon's weekly digital album chart and No. 44 on Oricon's weekly album chart.

The official music video of B.I's title track "Illa Illa" surpassed 12.7 million views on YouTube, within the first 24 hours of its release. With this, B.I broke the record for the most viewed male solo artist debut M/V within the first 24 hours.

== Track listing ==
All lyrics are written by B.I.

Waterfall track listing
No.	Title	Music	Arrangement	Length
1.	"Waterfall"	B.I; Choice37; Hae	Choice37; Hae	2:45
2.	"Illa Illa" (해변; Haebyeon [lit. "Beach"])	B.I; Millennium; Kang Uk-jin; Diggy; Sihwang	Millennium; Sihwang	3:25
3.	"Daydream" (featuring Lee Hi) (긴 꿈; Gin Kkum [lit. "Long Dream"])	B.I; Saint Leonard	Saint Leonard	3:14
4.	"Numb"	B.I; Stally; Basecamp	Stally; Basecamp	3:46
5.	"Illusion" (꿈결; Kkumgyeol [lit. "Dream"])	B.I; JFKID	JFKID	3:18
6.	"Flow Away"	B.I; Millennium	Millennium	3:44
7.	"Help Me"	B.I; Millennium; Sihwang	Millennium; Sihwang	3:20
8.	"Remember Me" (역겹겠지만; Yeokgyeobgetjiman [lit. "It May Be Disgusting"])	B.I; Millennium	Millennium	3:39
9.	"Stay" (featuring Tablo; lyrics co-written by Tablo)	B.I; Choice37; Hae	Choice37; Hae	2:56
10.	"Gray" (비 온 뒤 흐림; Bi On Dwi Heurim [lit. "Cloudiness After Rain"])	B.I; Kang Uk-jin; Diggy; Eddy	Kang Uk-jin; Diggy	3:22
11.	"Then" (그땐 내가; Geuttaen Naega [lit. "Back Then, I"])	B.I; Padi	Padi	3:11
12.	"Re-Birth" (다음 생; Daeum Saeng [lit. "Next Life"])	B.I; Sihwang; Millennium	Sihwang; Millennium	3:23
Total length:				40:07

== Accolades ==
Year-end lists
Publisher	Year	Listicle	Work	Rank	Ref.
Time	2021	The Best K-Pop Songs and Albums of 2021	Waterfall	—N/a	
MTV News	2021	The 21 Best K-Pop B-Sides Of 2021	"Waterfall"	—N/a	

== Charts ==
Weekly chart performance for Waterfall
Chart (2021)	Peak position
Japanese Albums (Oricon)	44
Japan Download Albums (Billboard Japan)	8
South Korean Albums (Gaon)	6

Monthly chart performance for Waterfall
Chart (2021)	Peak position
South Korean Albums (Gaon)	9

== Personnel ==
Credits are adapted from the album's liner notes.

=== Production ===
- B.I – executive producer
- Oh Hyung-seok – recording, mixing
- Park Jung-ho – mixing assistant
- Chris Gehringer – mastering

=== Additional personnel ===
- Sim Hye-jin – A&R director
- Oh Su-min – A&R
- Lim Da-hye – A&R
- Yang Jin-woo – A&R
- Choi Tae-won – A&R
- Yoo Pil-jong – management director
- Kim Woogie – music video director
- Yeom Woo-jin – track film director
- AFF – track film director
- Kimheejune – photography (Waterfall version)
- Rie – photography (Seaside version)
- Narae – design director
- Jung Fwan-wook – styling
- Kim So-hee – hair
- Choi Hyeon-sung – hair assistant
- Park So-yeon – hair assistant
- Noh Hang-yeol – make-up
- Lee Young-ji – make-up assistant
- Youngbeen – choreography ("Waterfall")
- Lee Han-sol – choreography ("Illa Illa")
- Yu Jung-wan – choreography ("Illa Illa")
- Kinjaz – choreography ("Illa Illa")
- Xin Seoul – promotion photography
- Jang Jin-woo – executive adviser

== Release history ==
Release dates and formats for Waterfall
Region	Date	Format(s)	Edition(s)	Label	Ref.
Various	June 1, 2021	Digital download; streaming	Standard	IOK Music x 131 Label	
South Korea	June 1, 2021	CD (2 versions: Waterfall and Seaside)	Standard	IOK Music x 131 Label	
Japan	July 5, 2021	CD (2 versions: Waterfall and Seaside)	Japanese	IOK Music x 131 Label	
South Korea	December 6, 2021	LP (1 version)	Limited	IOK Music x 131 Label	
