= The New Kids (album) =

- Digital and Red version cover

Compilation album by iKON
- Released: January 7, 2019
- Length: 81:53
- Language: Korean
- Label: YG
- Producer: B.I

IKON chronology
New Kids: The Final (2018)	The New Kids (2019)	I Decide (2020)

Singles from The New Kids
- 1. "Bling Bling" Released: May 22, 2017; 2. "B-Day" Released: May 22, 2017; 3. "Love Scenario" Released: January 25, 2018; 4. "Rubber Band" Released: March 5, 2018; 5. "Killing Me" Released: August 2, 2018; 6. "Freedom" Released: August 2, 2018; 7. "Goodbye Road" Released: October 1, 2018; 8. "I'm OK" Released: January 7, 2019

The New Kids is the first compilation album by South Korean boy band iKON, released through YG Entertainment on January 7, 2019. It is a compilation of the 2017 single album New Kids: Begin, the 2018 album Return, the digital single "Rubber Band", and the EPs New Kids: Continue and New Kids: The Final. It features the lead single and only new track, "I'm OK".

This is the last iKON album to feature the appearance of member B.I before his departure in June 2019.

== Background ==
YG Entertainment announced the album on Twitter on December 27, 2018, posting that the album would be available online from January 7, 2019, and as a physical version from January 8. It serves as a repackage and compilation of the other entries in the New Kids series, from 2017 to 2018.

== Promotion ==
iKON played an encore concert in Seoul, where they debuted the single "I'm OK". Along with concerts in Japan, Australia, and other Asian countries, they also performed on the 2018 year-end music show MBC Gayo Daejejeon.

== Track listing ==
Disc 1
No.	Title	Lyrics	Music	Arrangement	Length
1.	"Bling Bling"	B.I; Bobby; Millennium	B.I; Millennium	Millennium	3:39
2.	"Love Scenario" (사랑을 했다; Sarang-eul haetda)	B.I; Bobby; Mot Mal	B.I; Millennium; Seung	Millennium	3:29
3.	"Killing Me" (죽겠다; juggetda)	B.I	B.I; Joe Rhee; R.Tee	R.Tee; Joe Rhee	3:13
4.	"Freedom"	B.I; Bobby; Seung	Millennium; B.I; Seung	Millennium	3:21
5.	"B-Day" (벌떼; beoltte)	B.I; Bobby	B.I; Airplay; Kang Uk Jin	Airplay; Kang Uk Jin	3:34
6.	"Rubber Band" (고무줄다리기; gomujuldaligi)	B.I; Mino; Seung; Bobby	B.I; Mino; Millennium	Millennium	3:17
7.	"Beautiful"	B.I; Bobby; Teddy Park	Choice37; B.I; Teddy	Choice37; Teddy	3:16
8.	"Cocktail" (칵테일; kagteil)	B.I; Bobby	B.I; Millennium	Millennium	3:46
9.	"Only You"	B.I; Bobby	B.I; Kang Uk-jin	Kang Uk-jin	3:32
10.	"Everything"	B.I; Bobby; Psy	Psy; Yoo Gun-hyung; B.I	Psy; Yoo Gun-hyung	3:34
11.	"Love Me" (나를 사랑하지 않나요?; nareul saranghaji anhnayo?)	B.I; Bobby; S-Kush; Ju-ne	Choice37; B.I; S-Kush; Ju-ne	Choice37	3:28
12.	"Don't Let Me Know" (내가 모르게; naega moleuge)	B.I; Seung	B.I; Millennium	Millennium	3:21

Disc 2
No.	Title	Lyrics	Music	Arrangement	Length
1.	"I'm OK"	B.I; Bobby; Kim Jong-won	B.I; Future Bounce	Future Bounce	3:36
2.	"Goodbye Road" (이별길; ibyeolgil)	B.I; Bobby	B.I; Future Bounce; Bekuh BOOM	Future Bounce	3:59
3.	"Long Time No See"	B.I; Bobby	B.I; Choice37; Lydia; Taeyang	Choice37	3:26
4.	"Best Friend"	B.I; Lee Jung Hyun	Future Bounce; Bekuh BOOM; B.I	Future Bounce	3:50
5.	"Just Go"	B.I	B.I; Kang Uk-jin	Kang Uk-jin	3:36
6.	"Adore You" (좋아해요; joh-ahaeyo)	B.I; Bobby	B.I; Seo Won-jin	Seo Won-jin; R.Tee	3:30
7.	"Don't Forget" (잊지마요; ij-jimayo)	B.I; Bobby; Kim Joon	B.I; Kang Uk-jin; Diggy	Kang Uk-jin; Diggy	4:13
8.	"Jerk" (나쁜놈; nappeunnom)	B.I; Bobby	B.I; Kang Uk-Jin	Kang Uk-Jin	3:43
9.	"Perfect" (꼴좋다; kkoljohda)	B.I	B.I; Future Bounce	Future Bounce	3:33
10.	"Hug Me" (안아보자; an-aboja)	B.I; Bobby	B.I; Tablo	Tablo	3:36
11.	"Just for You" (줄게; julge)	B.I	B.I; Kang Uk-jin; LIØN	Kang Uk-jin; LIØN	3:21
Total length:					81:53

== Charts ==
Chart (2019)	Peak position
Japanese Albums (Oricon)	30
South Korean Albums (Gaon)	1
