= IKon 2018 Continue Tour =

2018–19 concert tour by iKON

iKON 2018 Continue Tour
- Tour by iKON
- Poster of iKON 2018 Continue Tour in Seoul
- Associated album: New Kids: Begin Return New Kids: Continue New Kids: The Final
- Start date: August 18, 2018
- End date: January 6, 2019
- No. of shows: 10 in Asia; 2 in Oceania; 12 total

iKON concert chronology
- iKON Japan Dome Tour (2017); iKON 2018 Continue Tour (2018); iKON Japan Tour 2018 (2018)

iKON 2018 Continue Tour is the first world tour by South Korean boy band iKON, in support of second studio album Return. The tour is set to visit South Korea, Taiwan, Thailand, Malaysia, Singapore, Philippines, Hong Kong, Indonesia and Australia, with more countries to be announced. The tour began on August 18, 2018 in Seoul at KSPO Dome

== Background ==
On July 2, it was announced by YG Entertainment that iKON will held an Asia tour and will visit eight cities. It marks the group second Asia tour after their 2016 iKoncert 2016: Showtime Tour, during the time they did two years intensive touring mostly in Japan as they gathered around 800,000 fans. A series of teasers were released in July, revealed members thoughts on the upcoming world tour and reveling the concept of the tour is A Road with No End, which indicates iKON's future path.

On August, iKON announced that the tour will visit Australia for the first time, with two shows in Sydney and Melbourne.

== Concerts dates ==
Date	City	Country	Venue	Attendance
Asia
August 18, 2018	Seoul	South Korea	KSPO Dome	—N/a
September 22, 2018	Taipei	Taiwan	NTSU Arena	3,500
October 13, 2018	Kuala Lumpur	Malaysia	Malawati Stadium	7,000
October 19, 2018	Bangkok	Thailand	Thunder Dome	5,000
October 20, 2018	Bangkok	Thailand	Thunder Dome	5,000
Oceania
October 25, 2018	Sydney	Australia	Big Top Sydney	—N/a
October 27, 2018	Melbourne	Australia	Festival Hall	—N/a
Asia
November 4, 2018	Singapore	Singapore	The MAX Pavilion	—N/a
November 11, 2018	Pasay	Philippines	Mall of Asia Arena	18,000
November 18, 2018	Jakarta	Indonesia	Tennis Indoor Senayan	TBA
November 25, 2018	Hong Kong	China	AsiaWorld–Arena	TBA
January 6, 2019	Seoul	South Korea	KSPO Dome	—N/a
