= I Decide =

- Digital and Red version cover

EP by iKON
- Released: February 6, 2020
- Length: 16:59
- Language: Korean
- Label: YG
- Producer: B.I

IKON chronology
The New Kids (2019)	I Decide (2020)	Flashback (2022)

Singles from I Decide
- 1. "Dive" Released: February 6, 2020

I Decide (stylized as i DECIDE) is the third extended play by South Korean boy band iKON. It is the first release of the band since the departure of B.I on June 12, 2019. It was released by YG Entertainment on February 6, 2020. The mini-album includes a total of five tracks, including the lead single "Dive".

== Background and release ==
On January 21, 2020, YG Entertainment announced the return of iKON on February 6 titled "I Decide" as well as a concept teaser for the EP. Two days later, a video teaser titled "Definition of 'i Decide'" was released through the band's official YouTube channel. The main poster was released in January 29. The next day, the label announced the name of the lead single of the album threw a title poster: "Dive". On January 31, a concept film for the song was released threw iKON's YouTube channel. The next day, the tracklist for the EP was released the name of the five tracks. On February 2, individual teaser pictures with lyrics for "Dive" were released in two versions: Red and Black. On February 3, the band released a first trailer of the music video for "Dive". The following day, iKON released a sampler for their album as well as a mood clip of the music video for the title track. The second trailer for "Dive" was uploaded on February 5 on their YouTube channel.

The EP was released in February 5 in CD and digital formats. The accompanying music video for "Dive" was released at the same time on their official YouTube channel.

== Composition ==
Among the five songs included in the album, four of them were written and composed by ex-member B.I, including the title track "Dive".

Member Bobby participated in writing the lyrics for the songs "Ah Yeah", "All the World" and "Flower" while DK co-wrote the lyrics for "Flower" along with him and composed it as well.

== Commercial performance ==
I Decide debuted at number 3 on the Gaon Album Chart in South Korea, selling 55,254 copies. In Japan, the mini-album debuted at number 15 on the Oricon Albums Chart, selling 1,000 digital copies and 3,306 physical copies in the country. It also debuted at number 5 on the Download Albums and number 16 on the Hot Albums on Billboard Japan.

== Track listing ==
Credits adapted from YG Entertainment's official website.

No.	Title	Lyrics	Music	Arrangement	Length
1.	"Ah Yeah"	B.I; Bobby	B.I; Millennium	Millennium	3:08
2.	"Dive" (뛰어들게; ttwieodeulge)	B.I; Seung	B.I; Diggy; Kang Uk-jin	Diggy; Kang Uk-jin	3:10
3.	"All the World" (온 세상; on sesang)	B.I; Dustyy Han; Bobby	B.I; Diggy; Kang Uk-jin; Dustyy Han	Diggy; Kang Uk-jin	3:20
4.	"Holding On" (견딜만해; gyeondilmanhae)	B.I	B.I; Diggy; Kang Uk-jin	Diggy; Kang Uk-jin	3:02
5.	"Flower" (너란 바람 따라; neolan balam ttala; lit. Follow the wind that is you)	DK; Bobby	DK; HRDR; iHWAK	HRDR	4:19
Total length:					16:59

== Charts ==
Chart (2020)	Peak position
South Korean Albums (Gaon)	3
Japanese Albums (Oricon)	15
Japan Download Albums (Billboard Japan)	5
Japan Hot Albums (Billboard Japan)	16

== Release history ==
Country	Date	Label	Format	Ref.
Various	February 6, 2020	YG	Digital download, CD	
