= B.I (rapper) =

South Korean rapper (born 1996)

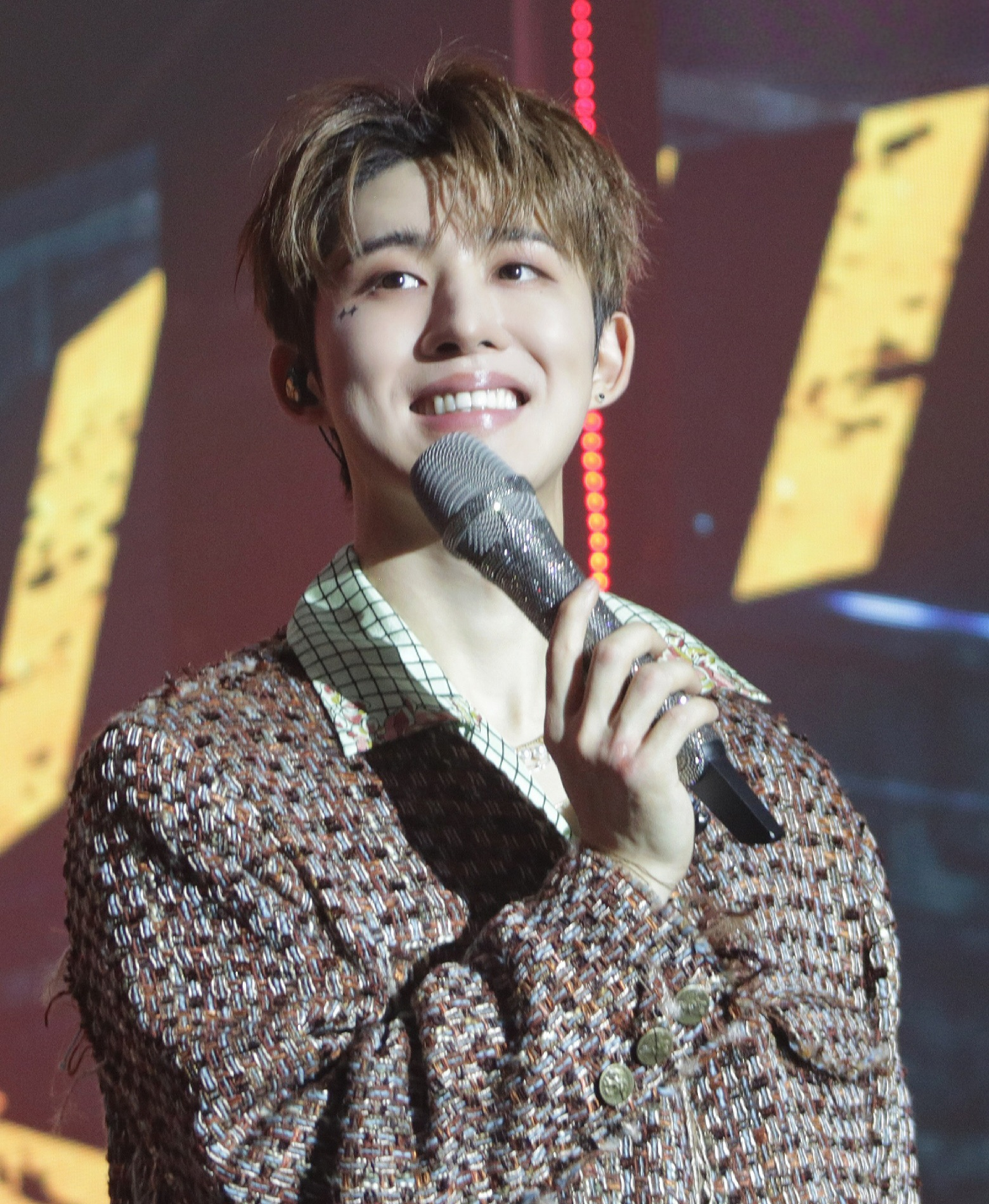
- B.I performs in December 2022
- Born: Kim Han-bin; October 22, 1996 (age 30); Cheonan, South Korea
- Occupations: Rapper; singer; songwriter; record producer; executive producer
- Musical career
- Genres: K-pop; hip hop; R&B; pop; EDM
- Instrument: Vocals
- Years active: 2009; 2013–present
- Labels: YG; 131
- Formerly of: iKon
- Website: 131online.net/bi

Korean name
- Hangul: 김한빈
- Hanja: 金韓彬
- RR: Gim Hanbin
- MR: Kim Hanbin

Signature
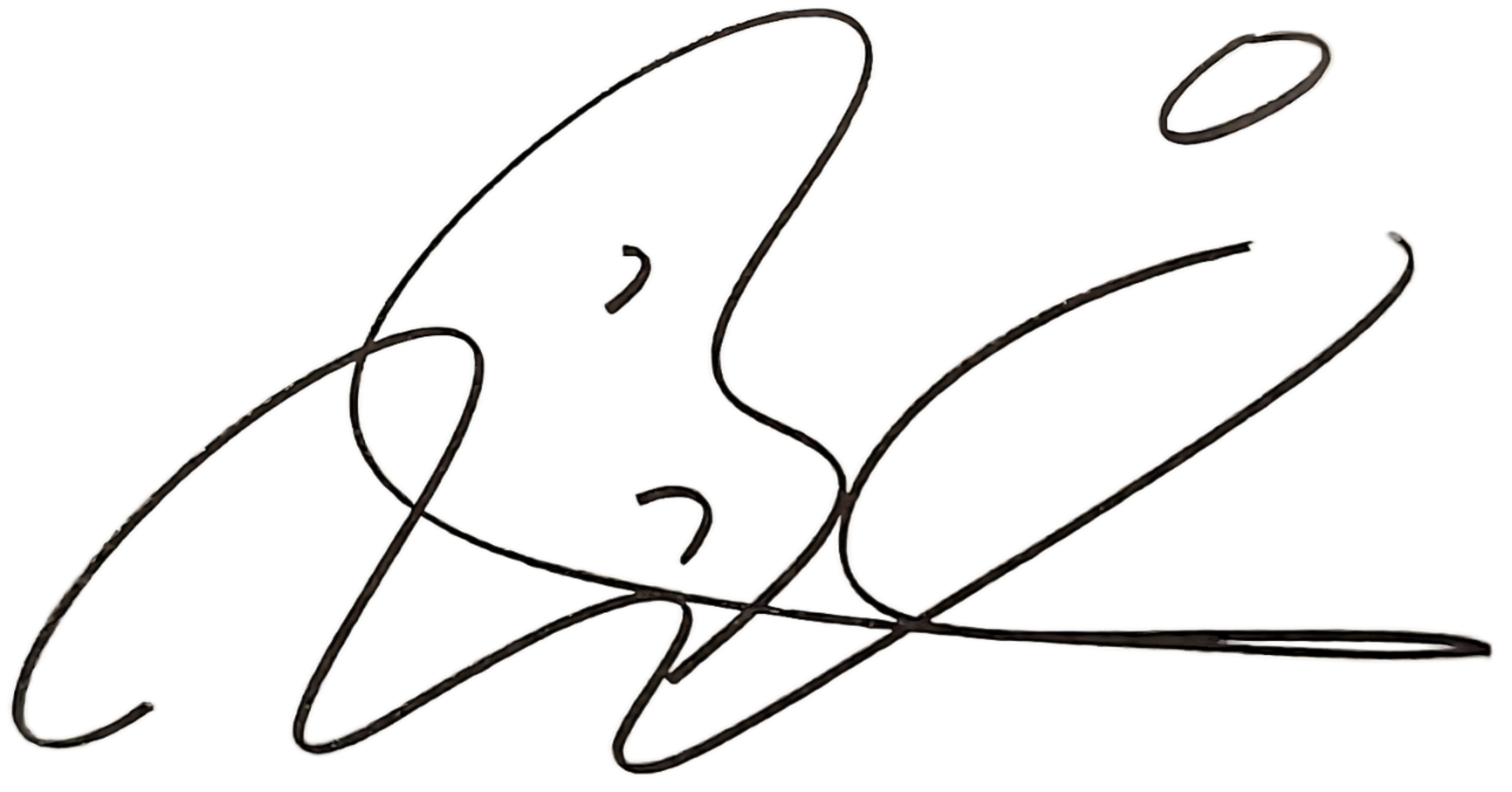

Kim Han-bin (Korean: 김한빈; born October 22, 1996), known professionally as B.I (Korean: 비아이) is a South Korean rapper, singer, songwriter, record producer. He debuted in the South Korean boy band iKon under YG Entertainment in September 2015. On June 12, 2019, he departed from the group due to substance allegations. During his time with the group, he played a significant role in the production and songwriting of their music, and is credited as the sole record producer for all of the group's releases. His contributions to iKon's second studio album, Return, for the lead single "Love Scenario", earned him the prestigious "Songwriter of the Year" award at the 2018 Melon Music Awards.

In 2021, he debuted as a solo artist under his self-founded label, 131, with the charity single album Midnight Blue (Love Streaming) and full-length charity studio album Waterfall. Cosmos, the first half of his second studio album was released in November 2021. In 2022, he launched his global album project Love or Loved, starting with the single "BTBT" in May, followed by the EP Love or Loved Part.1 in November. B.I released his second studio album To Die For on June 1, 2023, and the last part of the Love or Loved project, the EP Love or Loved Part.2, in November 2023. His third studio album, Wonderland, was released on June 1, 2025.

== Early life ==
Kim Han-bin was born on October 22, 1996, in Cheonan, South Korea.

In 2009, B.I made his first appearance by featuring and participating in promotions for MC Mong's single "Indian Boy", including live performances and accompanying the rapper to the TV show You Hee-yeol's Sketchbook. He also appeared in the music video for the song and had a cameo appearance in the music video of another song by MC Mong, "Horror Show".

B.I joined YG Entertainment as a trainee in January 2011.

== Career ==
=== 2013–2014: Career beginnings ===
After over two years of training, in 2013, B.I participated in Mnet reality survival program WIN: Who Is Next as a contestant under Team B. However, his team's opponent, Team A, won the program, so B.I, together with the other members of the team, continued as a trainee under YG Entertainment. In 2014, B.I and his label-mate Bobby competed in Mnet's Show Me the Money 3, during which B.I released his self-written digital single "Be I", which became the first single from the show to top the charts. This was noteworthy as he was only 17 years old and still a trainee at the time.

While B.I was still competing on Show Me the Money 3, it was announced in September 2014 that Team B would return to compete on another survival program, Mix & Match. This show eventually led to the debut of Team B, with the addition of trainee Jung Chan-woo, under the group name iKon. In October 2014, B.I was featured in label-mate Epik High's lead single "Born Hater" alongside Beenzino, Verbal Jint, Bobby, and Winner's Mino, and they performed the song together at the 2014 Mnet Asian Music Awards.

=== 2015–May 2019: Leader of iKon ===
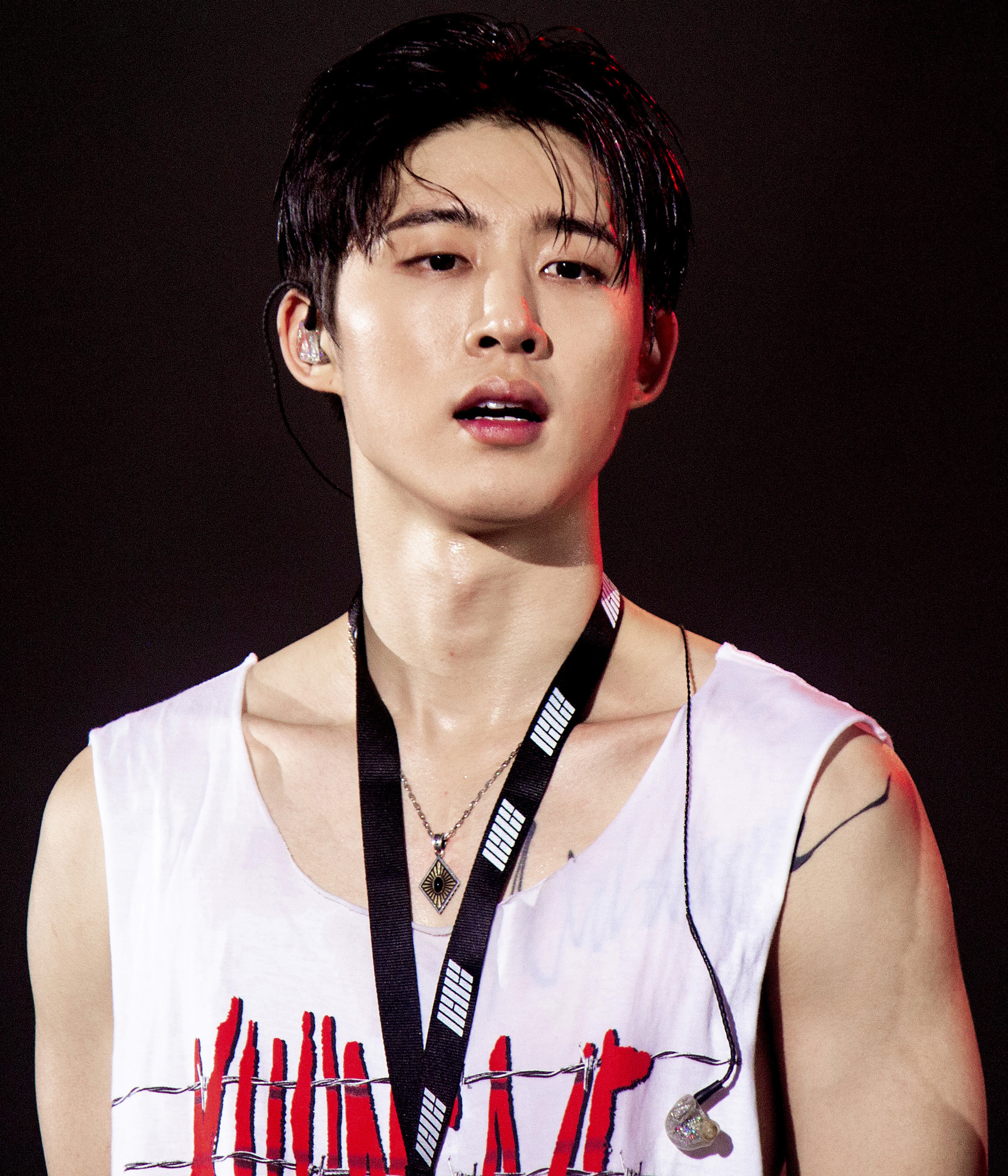
B.I at the iKon 2018 Continue Tour in Seoul on August 18, 2018

B.I made his debut as the leader of iKon under YG Entertainment on September 15, 2015, with their warm-up single "My Type" (취향저격), followed by lead singles "Rhythm Ta" (리듬 타) and "Airplane" on October 1, 2015.

Throughout his leadership tenure, B.I played a significant role in the production and songwriting of iKon's music, This includes the group's full-length studio albums Welcome Back and Return, as well as the compilation album The New Kids, and singles and EPs such as "#WYD" (오늘 모해), New Kids: Begin, "Rubber Band" (고무줄다리기), New Kids: Continue, and New Kids: The Final. He is credited as the sole record producer for all of iKon's albums.

In December 2018, B.I was awarded the "Songwriter of the Year" award at the 10th Melon Music Awards for his contributions to iKon's second studio album, Return, and specifically for his work on the lead single "Love Scenario" (사랑을 했다). Deemed one of the "100 greatest songs in the history of Korean pop music" by Rolling Stone in 2023, "Love Scenario" topped the South Korean Gaon Digital Chart for the year 2018, and received several awards in South Korea, including the Melon Music Award for "Song of the Year", the Golden Disc Award for "Song of the Year", and the Seoul Music Award for "Best Song".

While serving as the leader of iKon, B.I released one non-promoted solo track, "One and Only" (돗대), as a B-side from iKon's album Return. In December 2015, he and fellow iKon member Jin-hwan joined the cast of JTBC's Mari and I (마리와 나). He was also featured in label-mate Psy's studio album 4X2=8 in June 2017, on the track "Bomb" along with Bobby, and on the track "Mollado" (몰라도) from Seungri's debut studio album, The Great Seungri, released on July 20, 2018.

In 2019, B.I was cast for JTBC2's variety show Grand Buda-guest. He was also featured on label-mate Lee Hi's single "No One" (누구 없소), and co-wrote and co-composed the track "1, 2" (한두 번) from her EP 24°C.

=== June 2019–2020: Departure from iKon and YG, hiatus ===
On June 12, 2019, following drug allegations, B.I left the group iKon and terminated his exclusive contract with YG Entertainment. Despite his departure from iKon and YG Entertainment, B.I was still credited with writing and composing four out of five songs on iKon's 2020 EP I Decide, including the title track "Dive", which was released by YG Entertainment on February 6.

On September 28, B.I was appointed as the executive director of IOK Company.

=== 2021: Return to music as a solo artist under 131, Waterfall, Cosmos ===
On January 11, 2021, it was announced that B.I would feature on Epik High's tenth studio album, Epik High Is Here 上 (Part 1), on the song "Acceptance Speech", which was released on January 18, along with the rest of the album. This was followed by B.I's release of a charity single album, Midnight Blue (Love Streaming), on March 19, through B.I's self-founded label, 131 Label, an affiliate of IOK Music. The label's name was inspired by the shape created when the letters "B" and "I" are combined. The debut single album contained three self-written songs, and an animated music video for lead single "Midnight Blue" was released on the same day. All tracks had been previously released, partially, as demos via B.I's SoundCloud between 2020 and 2021.

On May 7, 131 Label announced the release schedule for B.I as a solo artist. This included a global single "Got It Like That" featuring American artists Destiny Rogers and Tyla Yaweh, released on May 14, and his first full-length studio album, Waterfall, released on June 1. Waterfall featured former label-mates Lee Hi and Tablo of Epik High. A cinematic music video for the title track "Illa Illa" was also released alongside the album. The music video surpassed 12.7 million views on YouTube within the first 24 hours of its release, breaking the record for the most viewed K-pop male solo artist debut music video within the first 24 hours.

On August 25, B.I was announced to feature on Lee Hi's upcoming third studio album, 4 Only, on the song "Savior", which he wrote and co-composed. The music video for "Savior" was released on September 3. Supposedly distributed on August 27, the song was officially released on all platforms on September 9, along with the rest of the album. On October 1, B.I released the digital single "Lost At Sea (Illa Illa 2)", a reinterpretation of "Illa Illa", featuring British artist Bipolar Sunshine and Indonesian singer Afgan.

B.I held his first-ever solo concert online on October 3. During the virtual concert, which was exclusively streamed on LiveXLive, B.I performed the tracks from his debut studio album, Waterfall. Pink Sweats, Afgan, Destiny Rogers and Epik High joined him as guest performers. On November 11, B.I released the first half of his second studio album, Cosmos, including the lead single of the same name. South Korean singer-songwriter Colde was featured on the album. On November 25, he made an appearance on TV5's Lunch Out Loud, a Philippine variety show.

=== 2022–present: Love or Loved, To Die For, Wonderland ===
In January 2022, B.I became the first K-pop and Asian act to participate in the digital performance series by The Recording Academy called Grammy Global Spin, that aims to showcase artists from around the world. He performed a live band version of his song "Nineteen", which was originally released on his album Cosmos.

In April, B.I announced his global album project Love or Loved. He launched a pre-release single in collaboration with Soulja Boy titled "BTBT", featuring DeVita, on May 13. Also in May, B.I's label 131 unveiled the record production and songwriting team White Noise Club, which includes B.I and other South Korean producers Millennium, Sihwang, Padi, and Kim Chang-hoon. B.I later featured on Padi's digital single "Handsome", alongside South Korean rappers Nucksal, Kid Milli and Gaeko.

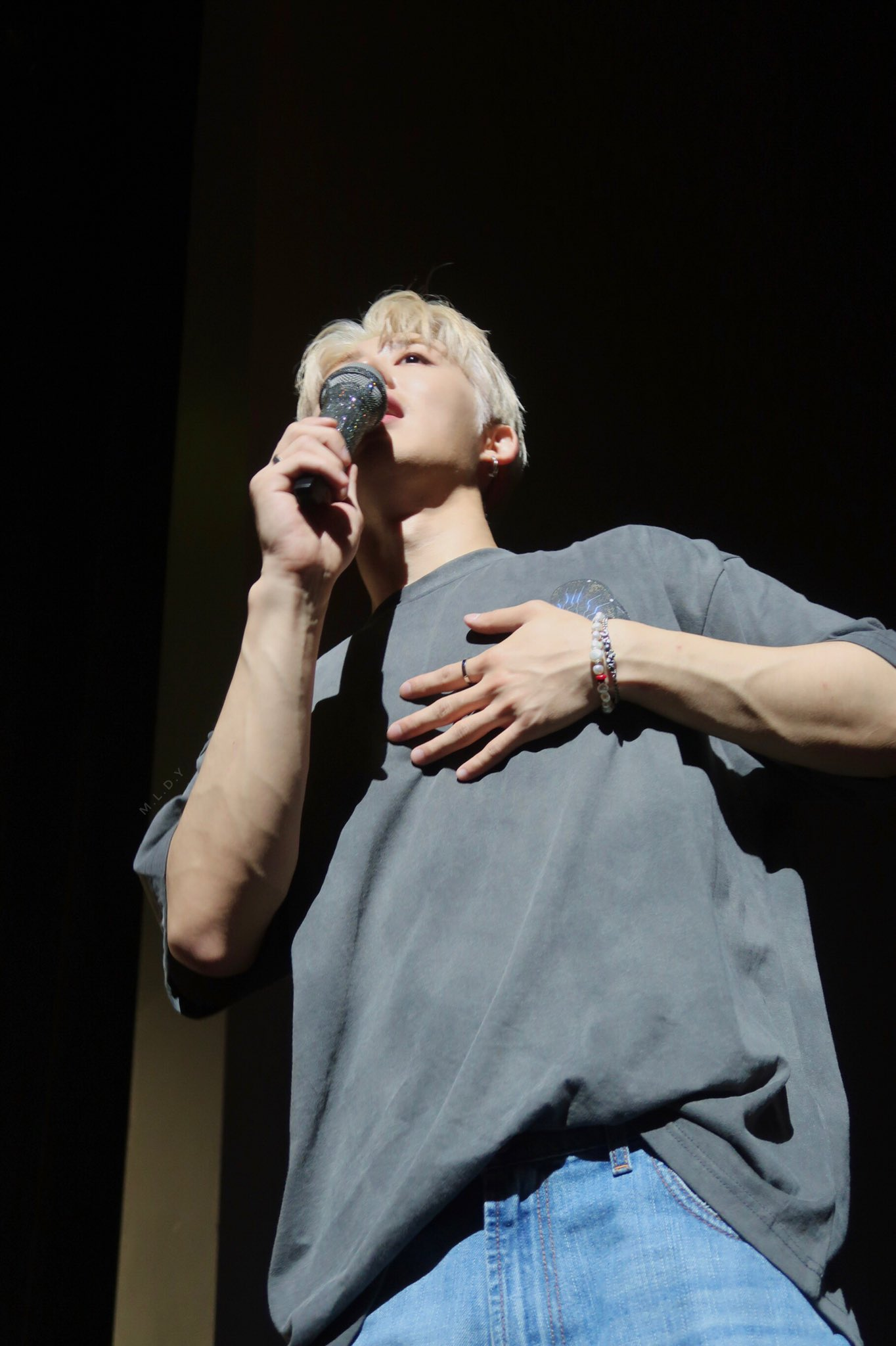
B.I at his first fan meeting in Singapore on August 7, 2022

From April to August, B.I performed "BTBT" and some tracks from Waterfall and Cosmos through a series of offline fan meetings in Seoul, Singapore, Bangkok and Manila. On June 26, he held his second online concert, BTBT Performance Online Fancon, which was exclusively streamed on LiveOne. During the event, he unveiled two unreleased tracks from his upcoming EP Love or Loved Part.1, "Tangerine" and "Endless Summer".

On June 27, B.I released the digital single "Lullaby" with Chuu as a collaboration with Dingo Music.

B.I announced his resignation as an executive director of IOK Company on October 11. Following his departure, his label 131 confirmed that it would operate as an independent label. The label had undergone a rebranding earlier in January 2022, from 131 Label to 131 (One Three One), or simply 131. It had also signed its first artist besides B.I, Reddy, on September 30.

The first part of B.I's global album project, the EP Love or Loved Part.1 was released on November 18, featuring the pre-release single "BTBT" and a new lead single titled "Keep Me Up". Following the release of the EP, B.I held his first standard in-person concert as a soloist, titled L.O.L: The Hidden Stage, in Seoul on December 10. He performed a selection of songs from all of his albums, and was joined on stage by special guests Lee Hi and the Epik High trio.

On February 3, 2023, B.I's record label, 131, announced that he would be stepping down from his position as the head of the label in order to focus on his music work as an artist and producer, while the label would be managed by a team of entertainment business professionals. The label also announced a change in B.I's release schedule for 2023, stating that his second full-length studio album, the continuation of Cosmos, would be released first, so as to express his take on "love" to a full completion. The second part of his Love or Loved project, with stories about "loved" in the past tense, would be released later on.

On February 10, B.I and the record production and songwriting team White Noise Club produced A Tempo, the debut EP of the South Korean R&B singer-songwriter Soovi, as a part of their "New Voice Project". B.I contributed to writing and composing two of the songs, including the title track "Missing You".

In March, B.I embarked on the L.O.L: The Hidden Stage tour. The tour included six stops across Southeast and East Asia, with local special guests joining him on stage at some of the shows. It concluded on May 20, with an additional concert in Bangkok. B.I collaborated with Sik-K and Reddy for the single "TTM" that was released while he was touring, on April 27. In an interview with Esquire Korea, B.I shared that he was inspired by a scene from the movie Taxi Driver, in which the protagonist repeatedly asks "You talkin' to me?" in front of a mirror.

B.I's second studio album, titled To Die For, was released on June 1, including the lead singles "Dare to Love" (featuring Big Naughty) and "Die for Love" (featuring Jessi). Through an exploration of love and resistance, the album brought to a close the project about youth that B.I had started with Cosmos.

On July 10, the newly created agency Grid Entertainment announced that 131 had become their first affiliated label.

In July, 131 announced B.I's first concert tour in Europe, Love or Die, with 16 stops across 14 countries in September and October. The list included countries where South Korean artists rarely perform, such as Luxembourg, Estonia or Finland. Most of the dates were sold-out and Rolling Stone UK gave the concert in London a five out of five stars review, describing it as a "masterclass of live performance" and "one of those one-off perfect, euphoric night's out that are impossible to recreate, but ingrained as a core memory forever".

The release schedule for the second and last part of B.I's Love or Loved global album project, Love or Loved Part.2, was revealed shortly before the beginning of the tour. Prior to the release of the EP, on November 10, 2023, the title track, "Loved", became available on October 27. Another single from the EP, "4 Letters", was released on September 30. B.I also unveiled the title track on the stage of Lollapalooza Berlin, on September 10. He was the first South Korean artist to take part in the German edition of the festival.

On March 13, 2024, B.I released his first Japanese EP, Tadaima (ただいま; lit. 'I'm home'). The EP consisted of five original songs written in Japanese, with two lead singles, "Kowai" (怖い) and "Wish You Were Here", and guest appearances of rappers Sky-Hi and Chanmina on B-side tracks. "Kowai" had been made available in advance on February 23.

B.I's second tour in Asia, Hype Up, was announced in March 2024. He held seven concerts from May to July in Hong Kong, Bangkok, Singapore, Manila, Jakarta, Kuala Lumpur and Macau, In September, he embarked on the European leg of the tour, with 14 concerts across 12 countries. On May 20, B.I released the global single "Tasty", for which he worked with a team of North American producers including Malibu Babie and Vaughn Oliver. On April 28, 2025, shortly after the end of the Oceanian leg of his Hype Up tour, B.I officially announced that he was back as the head of 131.

B.I's third album, Wonderland was released on June 1, exactly two years after his second studio album To Die For, and four years after his first studio album Waterfall. South Korean singer Heize was featured on the title track, "Ferris Wheel".

== Artistry ==
=== Musical style ===
B.I has mentioned "Shake Ya Tailfeather" by Nelly, P. Diddy and Murphy Lee, "Song Cry" by Jay-Z or Eminem's "Lose Yourself" as the songs that brought about his dream of becoming a rapper, when he was at primary school. But while hip-hop and R&B remain major influences on his music, he also looks up to the "not too elaborate but still very beautiful" music of the Beatles. Rather than "lock[ing] [him]self into a certain genre," he stated in 2022 that he was intent on exploring as many as he could, always trying to "experiment with new sounds," and "make the boundaries more blurry." Thus, the songs "Savior" he composed for Lee Hi (September 2021) and "Alive" (November 2021) were inspired by jazz, "Endless Summer" (November 2022) by tropical music and EDM, "Cosmos" (November 2021) by 1980s rock and doo-wop, "Illusion" (June 2021) by lo-fi, and so on. Even though his songs usually highlight electronic sounds, he has acoustic tracks as well, such as "Remember Me" (March 2021).

Similarly, B.I explained in 2021 that he wouldn't oppose rapping and singing, as they were simply two ways of "expressing the message of [his] music." He actually sings more than he raps in his album Love or Loved Part.1 (November 2022).

In 2018, B.I discussed the process behind his songwriting, admitting, "Because I don't have much experience, I typically draw a lot of my inspiration from movies or dramas. I'm also the type to draw inspiration from things like poetry". He explained that it was a way of "making up for things I'm unable to experience or feel for myself". When asked what type of music he wanted to make, he stated, "There are just two things. Music that people can relate to and music that draws imagination. Aside from that, the reason that I compose and make music is simply because it's fun. My hobby doesn't feel like work just yet".

=== Songwriting ===
B.I has written and co-composed all the songs in his debut single album, Midnight Blue (Love Streaming), his debut studio album, Waterfall, his half album Cosmos, his second studio album To Die For, his first Japanese EP Tadaima, and his third studio album Wonderland. Some of the songs of his global EPs Love or Loved Part.1 and Love or Loved Part.2 were composed by producers from the U.S., but he contributed to the writing of their lyrics.

During his tenure as the leader of iKon, B.I was instrumental in the production and songwriting of their music. He is credited as the sole record producer and main songwriter for all of their releases. This includes the group's full-length studio albums, Welcome Back and Return, compilation album, The New Kids, and various singles and EPs such as "#WYD", New Kids: Begin, "Rubber Band", New Kids: Continue, and New Kids: The Final. B.I also wrote and co-composed four of the five songs on the group's 2020 EP, I Decide. B.I's contributions to iKon's album Return, particularly for the lead single "Love Scenario", earned him the "Songwriter of the Year" award at the 2018 Melon Music Awards.

B.I has also written songs for other artists, including MC Mong, Heize and several current and former artists under YG Entertainment, such as Epik High, Winner, Blackpink, Psy, Seungri, Lee Hi, and Eun Ji-won.

B.I was selected as a full member of the Korea Music Copyright Association (KOMCA) on January 22, 2019. As of November 2025, 149 songs are registered under his name with KOMCA.

In 2022, B.I and South Korean producers Millennium, Sihwang, Padi, and Kim Chang-hoon founded the record production and songwriting team White Noise Club under 131. In 2023, White Noise Club produced the first EP of the South Korean R&B singer-songwriter Soovi, called A Tempo, with B.I taking part in writing and composing two of the songs, including the lead track "Missing You". The same year, White Noise Club also contributed to the debut EP by South Korean boy band Pow, Favorite. B.I, in particular, wrote and co-composed two of the four songs while co-wrote and co-composed another.

== Philanthropy ==
Starting from 2016, B.I has been making private donations to the Seungil Hope Foundation, which is a non-profit organization that raises awareness about ALS. The foundation disclosed in 2018 that B.I had donated a sum of 30 million won to their cause. B.I also donated 10 million won to the Hope Bridge National Disaster Relief Association in 2019 to help the victims of the forest fires in Sokcho, Gangwon Province. Furthermore, B.I, along with the cast and crew of Grand Buda-Guest, donated 30 million won worth of dog food to a dog shelter in Gyeonggi Province on June 10, 2019.

During the COVID-19 pandemic in 2020, B.I donated 100,000 face masks worth 200 million won to his fans, intended to be distributed to vulnerable groups such as children, the elderly, and low-income families, in South Korea, China, Thailand, Japan, Indonesia, and Vietnam. Additionally, B.I donated shoes to the childcare facility "Angel's Haven for Children" on August 10, 2020. He also surprised his fans by volunteering in Incheon and donating 10,000 KF94 masks to a briquette sharing project on December 19, 2020.

On December 18, 2020, B.I, and IOK Company donated 200 million won worth of items, including 200,000 masks and 10,000 underwear, to World Vision, an international relief and development NGO. On January 5, 2021, B.I and IOK company CEO Jang Jin-woo delivered an additional 200 million won worth of KF94 masks and underwear to Osan to help the vulnerable during the COVID-19 pandemic.

In March 2021, B.I released a charity single album called Midnight Blue (Love Streaming), and pledged to donate all proceeds from the sound sources, recordings, and copyright fees of the single album to World Vision to support children in crisis across the globe. On May 4, 2021, B.I met with the chairman of World Vision in Seoul to donate all the profits from the sale of 10,000 limited edition single albums of Midnight Blue (Love Streaming). B.I also promised to continuously donate all revenue generated from the digital music sales and copyright fees from the single album.

On September 17, 2021, IOK Company announced that B.I had made a second donation to World Vision. B.I plans to conduct a "monthly donation project" where he will continuously donate all his music and copyright profits from his Midnight Blue (Love Streaming) and Waterfall albums. The donations will include all copyright fees, music and album sales, and content revenue generated following the album's release, and will go towards the Basic for Girls project, which aims to improve women's restroom facilities in Zambia, Africa, and provide sanitary napkins to support women's health.

== Personal life ==
=== Drug allegation controversy ===
On June 12, 2019, it was revealed that B.I had allegedly attempted to purchase marijuana and LSD in 2016 from an undisclosed female dealer, and used the former. He was also accused of evading police charges. Following the reports, B.I posted an apology on his personal Instagram account. He acknowledged some of the allegations, explaining that he was going through "a hard and painful time and wanted something to rely on", and announced his departure from iKon. A few hours later, YG Entertainment confirmed that he had indeed left the group and terminated his exclusive contract. His appearances on television series Law of the Jungle, Grand Buda-Guest, and Stage K were edited out by the networks prior to their broadcast. The dealer was revealed to be Han Seo-hee, who was involved in drug issues with former label-mate T.O.P and received four years of probation in 2017.

In September 2019, it was reported that B.I had admitted during police questioning to violating the Act on the Control of Narcotics in 2016. In February 2020, results of a drug test conducted on B.I were released, revealing no detection of illegal drugs from a sample of B.I's body hair sent by South Korea's Gyeonggi Southern Provincial Police Agency to the National Forensic Service. On May 28, 2021, B.I was indicted without detention by the violent crimes department of the Seoul Central District Prosecutors' Office for violating the Act on the Control of Narcotics. During the first hearing, on August 26, 2021, he admitted to all the charges stated by the prosecution: three accounts of illegal marijuana usage and one account of purchasing illegal LSD in 2016. On September 10, 2021, the Seoul Central District Court sentenced B.I to three years of incarceration, suspended for a probationary period of four years, 80 hours of community service, 40 hours of drug education courses, and a fine of 1.5 million won (approximately US$1,300).

=== Military service ===
In March 2026, 131 announced that B.I will enlist for his mandatory military service and will serve as a public service worker on March 16.

== Awards and nominations ==
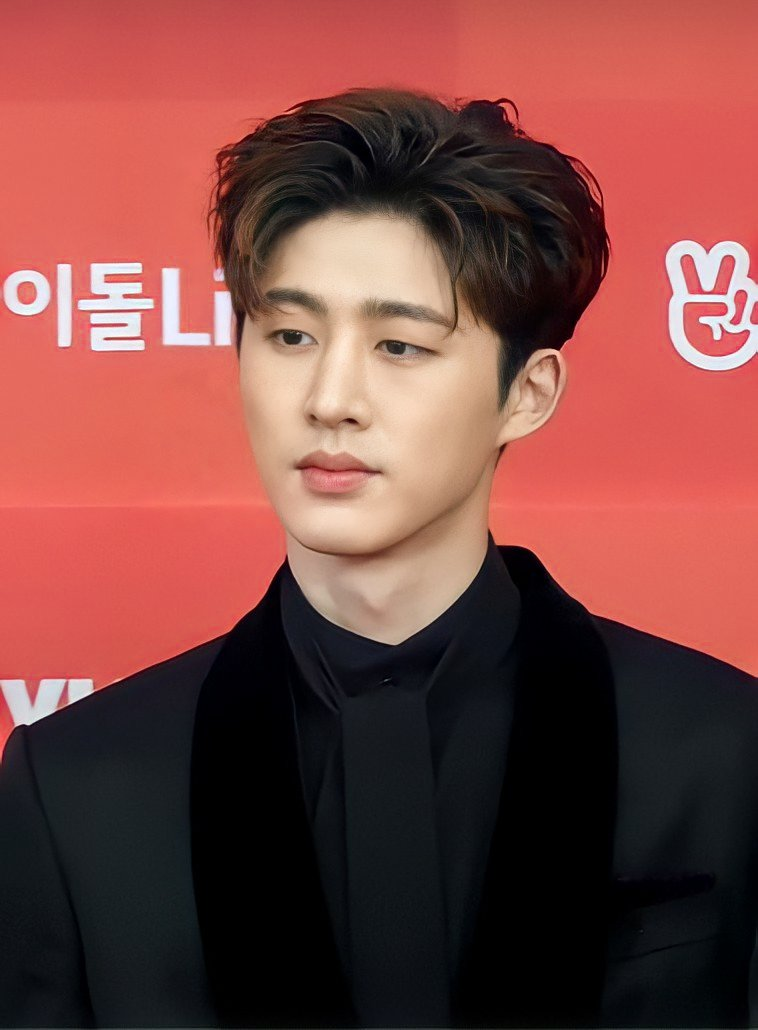
B.I on the red carpet of the 2019 Golden Disc Awards

Name of the award ceremony, year presented, category, nominee of the award, and the result of the nomination
Award ceremony	Year	Category	Nominee / Work	Result	Ref.
Hanteo Music Awards	2023	Emerging Artist Award	B.I	Nominated	
Hanteo Music Awards	2023	Special Award (Hip-hop)	B.I	Won	
Melon Music Awards	2018	Songwriter of the Year	B.I	Won	
Seoul Music Awards	2025	R&B / Hip-Hop Award	B.I	Nominated	
Supersound Festival	2025	Super Global Hip-hop Artist	B.I	Won	

== Discography ==
=== Studio albums ===
List of studio albums, with selected details, chart positions and sales
Title	Album details	Peak chart positions		Sales
Title	Album details	KOR	JPN	Sales
Waterfall	Released: June 1, 2021; Labels: IOK Music, 131 Label; Distributor: Dreamus; Formats: CD, LP, digital download, streaming	6	44	KOR: 104,101; JPN: 1,065 (Phy.)
To Die For	Released: June 1, 2023; Label: 131; Distributor: Dreamus; Formats: CD, digital download, streaming	12	—	KOR: 32,418
Wonderland	Released: June 1, 2025; Label: 131; Distributor: Dreamus; Formats: CD, LP, digital download, streaming	7	—	KOR: 32,940
"—" denotes releases that did not chart or were not released in that region.

=== EPs and half albums ===
List of extended plays and half albums, with selected details and chart positions
Title	Album details	Peak chart positions		Sales
Title	Album details	KOR	JPN	Sales
Cosmos	Released: November 11, 2021; Labels: IOK Music, 131 Label; Distributor: Dreamus; Formats: CD, digital download, streaming	5	—	KOR: 52,439
Love or Loved Part.1	Released: November 18, 2022; Labels: 131, Transparent Arts; Distributor: Sony Music; Formats: CD, digital download, streaming	11	—	KOR: 31,892
Love or Loved Part.2	Released: November 10, 2023; Labels: 131, Transparent Arts; Distributor: Sony Music / AWAL; Formats: CD, digital download, streaming	18	—	KOR: 25,282
Tadaima (ただいま)	Released: March 13, 2024; Label: Nippon Columbia; Formats: CD, digital download, streaming	—	12	JPN: 3,697

=== Single albums ===
List of single albums, with selected details, chart positions and sales
Title	Album details	Peak chart positions	Sales
Title	Album details	KOR	Sales
Midnight Blue (Love Streaming)	Released: March 19, 2021; Labels: IOK Music, 131 Label; Distributor: Dreamus; Formats: CD, digital download, streaming	14	KOR: 10,000

=== Singles ===
==== As lead artist ====
List of singles as lead artist, with selected chart positions, showing year released, sales and album name
Title	Year	Peak chart positions						Sales	Album
Title	Year	KOR	HUN	MLY Int.	SGP	US World	VIE	Sales	Album
"Be I"	2014	5	—	—	—	—	N/A	KOR: 409,985	Show Me the Money 3
"Anthem" (Note: Credited under iKon.) (이리오너라) (with Bobby)	2015	6	—	—	—	4	N/A	KOR: 145,516	Welcome Back
"Midnight Blue" (깊은 밤의 위로)	2021	— (Note: "Midnight Blue" did not enter the Gaon Digital Chart, but appeared at number 70 on the component Download chart.)	14	—	—	14	N/A	N/A	Midnight Blue (Love Streaming)
"Re-Birth" (다음생)	2021	—	—	—	—	—	N/A	N/A	Waterfall
"Got It Like That" (with Destiny Rogers and Tyla Yaweh)	2021	—	—	—	—	—	N/A	N/A	Non-album single
"Illa Illa" (해변)	2021	— (Note: "Illa Illa" did not enter the Gaon Digital Chart, but appeared at number 52 on the component Download chart.)	—	—	—	—	N/A	N/A	Waterfall
"Lost at Sea (Illa Illa 2)" (with Bipolar Sunshine and Afgan)	2021	—	—	—	—	—	N/A	N/A	Non-album single
"Cosmos"	2021	— (Note: "Cosmos" did not enter the Gaon Digital Chart, but appeared at number 75 on the component Download chart.)	—	—	—	—	N/A	N/A	Cosmos
"BTBT" (with Soulja Boy, featuring DeVita)	2022	—	—	17	14	—	11	N/A	Love or Loved Part.1
"Lullaby" (자장가) (with Chuu)	2022	— (Note: "Lullaby" did not enter the Circle Digital Chart, but appeared at number 81 and 103 on components Download chart and BGM chart, respectively.)	—	—	—	—	—	N/A	Non-album single
"Keep Me Up"	2022	— (Note: "Keep Me Up" did not enter the Circle Digital Chart, but appeared at number 178 on the Download chart.)	—	—	—	—	—	N/A	Love or Loved Part.1
"TTM" (with Sik-K and Reddy)	2023	—	—	—	—	—	—	N/A	Non-album single
"Die for Love" (featuring Jessi)	2023	— (Note: "Die for Love" did not enter the Circle Digital Chart, but appeared at number 170 on the Download chart.)	—	—	—	—	—	N/A	To Die For
"Dare to Love" (겁도없이) (featuring Big Naughty)	2023	77	—	—	—	—	—	N/A	To Die For
"4 Letters" (featuring James Reid)	2023	—	—	—	—	—	—	N/A	Love or Loved Part.2
"Loved"	2023	— (Note: "Loved" did not enter the Circle Digital Chart, but appeared at number 194 on the component Download Chart.)	—	—	—	—	—	N/A	Love or Loved Part.2
"Kowai" (怖い)	2024	—	—	—	—	—	N/A	N/A	Tadaima (ただいま)
"Wish You Were Here"	2024	—	—	—	—	—	N/A	N/A	Tadaima (ただいま)
"Tasty"	2024	— (Note: "Tasty" did not enter the Circle Digital Chart, but appeared at number 157 on the component Download Chart.)	—	—	—	—	N/A	N/A	Non-album single
"Ferris Wheel" (관람차) (featuring Heize)	2025	— (Note: "Ferris Wheel" did not enter the Circle Digital Chart, but appeared at number 89 on the component Download Chart.)	—	—	—	—	N/A	N/A	Wonderland
"—" denotes releases that did not chart or were not released in that region.

==== As featured artist ====
List of singles as featured artist, with selected chart positions, showing year released, sales and album name
Title	Year	Peak chart positions			Sales	Album
Title	Year	KOR Circle	KOR Hot (Note: The Billboard K-pop Hot 100 chart launched in 2011 and was discontinued on July 16, 2014. The chart was later re-established following the term date of May 29 – June 4, 2017. It has been suspended since April 23, 2022.)	US World	Sales	Album
"Indian Boy" (MC Mong featuring Jang-geun, B.I)	2009	N/A	N/A	N/A	N/A	Humanimal
"Born Hater" (Epik High featuring Beenzino, Verbal Jint, B.I, Mino, and Bobby)	2014	3	N/A	5	KOR: 1,498,062	Shoebox
"No One" (누구 없소) (Lee Hi featuring B.I)	2019	2	4	6	N/A	24°C
"Handsome" (Padi featuring B.I, Nucksal, Kid Milli, Gaeko)	2022	—	N/A	—	N/A	Non-album singles
"Jacuzzi" (James Reid, B.I, DJ Flict)	2023	—	N/A	—	N/A	Non-album singles
"Smoke (Remix)" (Dynamic Duo, Zico, B.I, Jay Park, Changmo, Jessi)	2023	— (Note: "Smoke (Remix)" did not enter the Circle Digital Chart, but appeared at number 67 and 193 on components Download Chart and BGM Chart, respectively.)	N/A	—	N/A	Non-album singles
"INFJ" (Big Naughty featuring B.I, Bang Ye-dam)	2023	— (Note: "INFJ" did not enter the Circle Digital Chart, but appeared at number 53 and 102 on components Download Chart and BGM Chart, respectively.)	N/A	—	N/A	Non-album singles
"Good Memories" (좋았던 기억만) (Gist featuring B.I)	2024	— (Note: "Good Memories" did not enter the Circle Digital Chart, but appeared at number 146 on the component Download Chart.)	N/A	—	N/A	Nothing Is Perfect (완벽한 건 없어)
"Pretty Plzzz" (Leo featuring B.I)	2024	—	N/A	—	N/A	Come Closer
"I Wish" (18번) (Toil featuring Leellamarz, B.I)	2024	—	N/A	—	N/A	Toto
"Beautiful" (Basecamp featuring B.I)	2024	—	N/A	—	N/A	Non-album singles
"Love Dilemma" (사랑이 죄야?) (Kixo featuring 10cm, B.I)	2024	96	N/A	—	N/A	Non-album singles
"Reditation" (Reddy featuring B.I)	2025	—	N/A	—	N/A	Reddy Made 0.5 Prototype
"Freak" (BM featuring B.I)	2025	—	—	Po:int		
"—" denotes releases that did not chart or were not released in that region.

=== Other charted songs ===
List of other charted songs, with selected chart positions, showing year released, sales and album name
Title	Year	Peak chart positions				Sales	Album
Title	Year	KOR Circle	KOR Hot	HUN	US World	Sales	Album
"Bomb" (Psy featuring B.I and Bobby)	2017	14	N/A	—	—	KOR: 166,479	4X2=8
"One and Only" (돗대)	2018	— (Note: "One and Only" did not enter the Gaon Digital Chart, but appeared at number 72 on the component Download chart.)	—	—	—	N/A	Return
"Acceptance Speech" (수상소감) (Epik High featuring B.I)	2021	99	97	—	—	N/A	Epik High Is Here 上
"Remember Me"	2021	—	—	30	18	N/A	Midnight Blue (Love Streaming)
"Blossom" (내 걱정)	2021	— (Note: "Blossom" did not enter the Gaon Digital Chart, but appeared at number 199 on the component Download chart.)	—	29	17	N/A	Midnight Blue (Love Streaming)
"Remember Me" (역겹겠지만)	2021	74	—	—	—	N/A	Waterfall
"Daydream" (긴 꿈)	2021	— (Note: "Daydream" did not enter the Gaon Digital Chart, but appeared at number 113 on the component Download chart.)	—	—	—	N/A	Waterfall
"Waterfall"	2021	— (Note: "Waterfall" did not enter the Gaon Digital Chart, but appeared at number 146 on the component Download chart.)	—	—	—	N/A	Waterfall
"Stay"	2021	— (Note: "Stay" did not enter the Gaon Digital Chart, but appeared at number 192 on the component Download chart.)	—	—	—	N/A	Waterfall
"Help Me"	2021	— (Note: "Help Me" did not enter the Gaon Digital Chart, but appeared at number 197 on the component Download chart.)	—	—	—	N/A	Waterfall
"Gray" (비 온 뒤 흐림)	2021	— (Note: "Gray" did not enter the Gaon Digital Chart, but appeared at number 199 on the component Download chart.)	—	—	—	N/A	Waterfall
"Numb"	2021	— (Note: "Numb" did not enter the Gaon Digital Chart, but appeared at number 200 on the component Download chart.)	—	—	—	N/A	Waterfall
"Savior" (구원자) (Lee Hi featuring B.I)	2021	150	71	—	—	N/A	4 Only
"—" denotes releases that did not chart or were not released in that region.

=== Other guest appearances ===
List of other guest appearances
Title	Year	Artist(s)	Album	Ref.
"Mollado" (몰라도) (featuring B.I)	2018	Seungri	The Great Seungri	
"R.I.P" (featuring B.I)	2023	Kid Milli	Beige	
"Sorry, I Hate You" (미안해 널 미워해) (featuring B.I)	2023	Sik-K	Pop a Lot	
"Happy Alone" (featuring B.I)	2024	Woosung	4444	
"Special" (featuring B.I)	2025	Reddy	Reddy Made 0.5 Prototype	
"New New" (뉴뉴) (featuring B.I)	2025	Huh	Voice tool tip.txt 2	

== Filmography ==
=== Television ===
Year	Title	Notes	Ref.
2013	Win: Who Is Next	Contestant	
2014	Show Me the Money 3	Contestant	
2014	Mix & Match	Contestant	
2015	Mari and I (마리와 나)	Cast member	
2018	The Game With No Name (문제는 없다)	Contestant	
2018	Curious Husband's Getaway (궁민남편)	Mentor	
2019	Law of the Jungle in Thailand	Cast member	
2019	Grand Buda-guest	Cast member	
2023	Wet! World EDM Trend	Special MC	

== Live performances ==
B.I's first concert as a soloist was held online on October 3, 2021, four months after his debut with Waterfall. His first regular concert, L.O.L: The Hidden Stage, took place in Seoul one year later, on December 10, 2022. In 2023, he embarked on his first tour of Asia, also titled L.O.L: The Hidden Stage, in the first semester, then his first tour of Europe, Love or Die, in the second semester.

From 2022 onwards, B.I also performed in various music events in South Korea and abroad, including South Korean hip hop festivals such as Rapbeat and Hiphopplaya festival, regional events such as KV Fest in Jakarta or S2O Songkran Music Festival in Hong Kong, K-pop concerts such as MIK Festival in Paris and Overpass in Manila, as well as international festivals such as Rolling Loud and Lollapalooza.

=== Tours ===
- L.O.L: The Hidden Stage Asia Tour (2023)
- Love or Die Europe Tour (2023)
- Hype Up Asia Tour (2024)
- Hype Up Europe Tour (2024)
- Hype Up Oceania Tour (2025)
- The Last Parade Tour (2025)
- The Last Parade Tour Encore (2026)
