= New Kids: The Final =

- Digital and Redout version cover.

EP by iKON
- Released: October 1, 2018
- Length: 14:23
- Language: Korean
- Label: YG
- Producer: B.I

IKON chronology
New Kids: Continue (2018)	New Kids: The Final (2018)	The New Kids (2019)

Singles from New Kids: The Final
- 1. "Goodbye Road" Released: October 1, 2018

New Kids: The Final is the second extended play by South Korean boy band iKON. It is the final installment of the group's four-part album series following the single album New Kids: Begin and extended play New Kids: Continue. It was released by YG Entertainment on October 1, 2018. The mini-album includes a total of four tracks.

== Composition ==
The lead single of the album is titled "Goodbye Road", which was released with a music video on October 1. The song is described as a sentimental hip-hop ballad which talks about the bitter feelings of a breakup. The music video that features the members and a woman mourning the end of their relationship, interspersing dramatic, reflective scenes with happy memories and choreography. The song's dance emulates its lyrics, with the choral declaration of "good-bye" coinciding with a shooing hand move. The three other songs on the album also revolve around the themes of the sadness and loneliness of love and breakups.

== Commercial performance ==
"Goodbye Road" topped both Korean and global charts upon its release. It ranked number one on six major Korean charts, as well as China's QQ Music's real-time chart.

== Track listing ==
No.	Title	Lyrics	Music	Arrangement	Length
1.	"Goodbye Road" (이별길; ibyeolgil)	B.I; Bobby	B.I; Future Bounce; Bekuh BOOM	Future Bounce	3:59
2.	"Don't Let Me Know" (내가 모르게; naega moleuge)	B.I; Seung	B.I; Millennium	Millennium	3:21
3.	"Adore You" (좋아해요; joh-ahaeyo)	B.I; Bobby	B.I; Seo Won-jin	Seo Won-jin; R.Tee	3:30
4.	"Perfect" (꼴좋다; kkoljohda)	B.I	B.I; Future Bounce	Future Bounce	3:33
Total length:					14:23

== Charts ==
Chart (2018)	Peak position
South Korean Albums (Gaon)	1

== Awards ==
=== Music programs ===
Song	Program	Date	Ref.
"Goodbye Road"	Show Champion (MBC Music)	October 10, 2018	
"Goodbye Road"	Show Champion (MBC Music)	October 17, 2018	
"Goodbye Road"	M Countdown (Mnet)	October 11, 2018	
"Goodbye Road"	M Countdown (Mnet)	October 18, 2018	
"Goodbye Road"	Music Bank (KBS2)	October 12, 2018	
"Goodbye Road"	Show! Music Core (MBC)	October 13, 2018	
"Goodbye Road"	Inkigayo (SBS)	October 14, 2018	

== Release history ==
Country	Date	Label	Format	Ref.
Various	October 1, 2018	YG	Digital download, CD	
