= Tadaima =

EP by B.I
- Released: March 13, 2024
- Length: 15:45
- Language: Japanese
- Label: Nippon Columbia

B.I chronology
Love or Loved Part.2 (2023)	Tadaima (2024)

Singles from Tadaima
- 1. "Kowai" Released: February 23, 2024; 2. "Wish You Were Here" Released: March 13, 2024

Tadaima (ただいま) is the first Japanese extended play by South Korean rapper and singer-songwriter B.I. It was released by Nippon Columbia on March 13, 2024, and consists of five original songs in Japanese, including the singles "Kowai" (怖い) and "Wish You Were Here".

== Release and promotion ==
On January 15, 2024, it was announced that B.I would debut in Japan as a solo artist with the EP Tadaima (ただいま), comprising five original songs written in Japanese. The date of release, the track list and the guest appearance of the Japanese rapper Sky-Hi on the track "Nanana" were disclosed as well.

The lead single "Kowai" (怖い) was first played on the radio on February 20, 2024. It was officially released on digital music platforms a few days later, on February 23, 2024. The EP became available on CD and digitally on March 13, 2024, along with a music video for the single "Wish You Were Here". It was then revealed that Tadaima also featured the South Korean-Japanese rapper Chanmina, on the song "Elevator".

== Background and production ==
In an interview for the Japanese magazine TV Life, B.I explained that the title of the EP, Tadaima (ただいま; lit. 'I'm home'), alluded to his return to Japan, which he had visited often in the earlier stages of his career. He chose songs that he thought his Japanese fans would like, with an overall nostalgic atmosphere, though two of them are lighter. The singer-songwriter also told BuzzFeed Japan that he translated the lyrics from Korean to Japanese very carefully, so as not to lose the messages he intended to convey. Other than that, he considered the production process for Tadaima to be generally the same as usual.

== Track listing ==
Tadaima track listing
No.	Title	Lyrics	Music	Arrangement	Length
1.	"Kowai" (怖い, lit. 'scary')	B.I	B.I, Kangwookjin, Diggy	Kangwookjin, Diggy	3:08
2.	"Wish You Were Here"	B.I	B.I, Padi	Padi	3:20
3.	"Sayonara" (さよなら, lit. 'goodbye')	B.I	B.I, Sihwang	Sihwang	3:12
4.	"Elevator" (featuring Chanmina)	B.I, Chanmina, Vaav	B.I, Padi	Padi	2:49
5.	"Nanana" (featuring Sky-Hi)	B.I, Sky-Hi, Vaav	B.I, Millennium	Millennium	3:14
Total length:					15:45

== Charts ==
Chart performance for Tadaima
Chart (2024)	Peak position
Japanese Albums (Oricon)	12
Japanese Digital Albums (Oricon)	42
Japanese Hot Albums (Billboard Japan)	11

== Personnel ==
Credits are adapted from the album's liner notes.

- B.I – executive producer, recording
- Sunwoo – mixing
- Chris Gehringer – mastering
- Shimi – recording (Sky-Hi on "Nanana")
- Jigg – recording (Chanmina on "Elevator")
- Aedia Studio – music video
- Kyutai Shim – photography
- Yoh Yanatori – design
- Fwanwook Jung – styling
- Mincheol Jang – styling assistant
- Sohyun Park – hair
- Yoonjin Ha – hair
- Hangyeol Noh – make-up
- Gayeon Yu – make-up

== Release history ==
Release dates and formats for Tadaima
Region	Date	Label	Format	Catalog	Ref.
Various	March 13, 2024	Nippon Columbia	Digital download; streaming	—N/a	
Japan	March 13, 2024	Nippon Columbia	CD (regular edition)	COCP-42185	
Japan	March 13, 2024	Nippon Columbia	CD+DVD (first edition A)	COZP-2071-2	
Japan	March 13, 2024	Nippon Columbia	CD+Photobook (first edition B)	COCP-42186	
