= To Die For (B.I album) =

Studio album by B.I
- Released: June 1, 2023
- Length: 45:59
- Language: Korean
- Label: 131
- Producer: B.I

B.I chronology
Love or Loved Part.1 (2022)	To Die For (2023)	Love or Loved Part.2 (2023)

Singles from To Die For
- 1. "Cosmos" Released: November 11, 2021; 2. "Die for Love" Released: June 1, 2023; 3. "Dare to Love" Released: June 1, 2023

Professional ratings
Review scores
Source	Rating
NME	4/5 stars

To Die For is the second studio album by South Korean rapper, singer, songwriter, record producer and dancer B.I. It was released on June 1, 2023 by 131, and distributed by Dreamus.

To Die For is the continuation of B.I's half album Cosmos, and explores various stories and emotions of youth. The album comprises a total of 15 songs, including six tracks previously released in Cosmos and nine new songs featuring collaborations with Korean-American singer-rapper Jessi, South Korean rappers Big Naughty, Kid Milli and Lil Cherry, and punk band Crying Nut.

== Background ==
On November 11, 2021, B.I released Cosmos, introducing it as the first half of his second studio album. The self-written seven-track half album is centered around the themes of youth, resistance, and love. In an interview published in April 2022, he described the division of the album into two parts as a "plot development", stating, "As I grow as a person and my music evolves, I hope my fans can travel with me on my journey as well."

B.I then turned his attention to the global album Love or Loved, which began with the release of the single "BTBT" in May 2022 and continued with the EP Love or Loved Part.1 in November 2022. Love or Loved is an exploration into love – "the start of love, the breaking up of love, all the stages of love". B.I chose to split the album into two parts once again, so that each EP would convey a clear message. Love or Loved Part.1 represents the "love" side of the project, meanwhile, the second part would represent the "loved" side, and will talk about "heartbreak, loneliness and emptiness".

Then on February 3, 2023, for a more effective message delivery, B.I's record label, 131, announced that his upcoming release would be the second half of his second studio album, with the intention of exploring his views on "love" to a full completion, before delving into stories about "loved" in the past tense with Love or Loved Part.2.

Following that, 131 released a teaser film at 00:00 KST on May 1, 2023, revealing that B.I's second studio album, titled To Die For, will be released on June 1 at 18:00 KST. The teaser features the album title written in motion on a typewriter and includes the quote "Dream as if you'll live forever. Live as if you'll die today", which is attributed to American actor James Dean that has come to symbolize eternal youth.

== Release and promotion ==
On May 3, 2023, 131 announced a special album promotion for To Die For, stating that B.I would hold offline guerrilla stage performances in different locations to personally introduce his new songs to fans ahead of the official release. In addition, from May 7 until his comeback, the album will be pre-released at various offline locations.

B.I's first guerrilla spoiler stage performance was held at the 2023 Daegu Hip Hop Festival on May 7, 2023, where he performed the upcoming singles "Die for Love" and "Dare to Love" for the first time. His second performance was on May 12, at TubeSeoul. On May 16, B.I released a karaoke version of "Dare to Love" and performed it at his third guerrilla live spoiler stage in a karaoke room in Seoul.

On May 20, 2023, B.I performed "Dare to Love", "Die for Love", and "Beautiful Life" at the encore concert of his B.I 2023 Asia Tour [L.O.L: The Hidden Stage] in Bangkok, Thailand. This concert also marked the conclusion of his East and Southeast Asia tour, which began in March 2023.

The promotional content posted by 131 on social media to promote the comeback (tracklist poster, title tracks posters, etc.) built on the cinematic theme of the first teaser. Then, instead of a traditional music video, a series of nine short films starring B.I was released at 00:00 KST on June 1, 2023 to tell the stories of the nine new songs.

== Track listing ==
To Die For track listing
No.	Title	Lyrics	Music	Arrangement	Length
1.	"To Die"	B.I	B.I; Padi	Padi	2:21
2.	"Wave" (featuring Kid Milli, Lil Cherry) (해일; Haeil [lit. "Tsunami"])	B.I; Kid Milli; Lil Cherry	B.I; Millennium; Sihwang; Kim Chang-hoon	Millennium; Sihwang; Kim Chang-hoon	2:50
3.	"The Island of Misfit Toys" (망가진 장난감의 섬; Manggajin Jangnangam-ui Seom [lit. "The Island of Broken Toys"])	B.I	B.I; Sihwang; Millennium	Sihwang; Millennium	3:23
4.	"Die for Love" (featuring Jessi)	B.I; Jessi	White Noise Club (Note: The five members of the team – B.I, Kim Chang-hoon, Millennium, Padi and Sihwang – were registered as composers with the Korea Music Copyright Association.); Jessi	Padi; Sihwang; Millennium	3:18
5.	"Cosmos"	B.I	B.I; Sihwang; Millennium	Sihwang; Millennium; Park Jae-jun	3:37
6.	"Nerd" (featuring Colde)	B.I; Sihwang	B.I; Millennium; Sihwang	Millennium; Sihwang	3:07
7.	"Dare to Love" (featuring Big Naughty) (겁도없이; Geobdoeobs-i [lit. "Fearlessly"])	B.I; Big Naughty	B.I; Big Naughty; Kang Uk-jin; Diggy	Kang Uk-jin; Diggy	2:55
8.	"Nineteen" (열아홉; Yeorahop [lit. "Nineteen"])	B.I	B.I; Saint Leonard	Saint Leonard	3:20
9.	"Beautiful Life" (featuring Crying Nut) (개가트닌생; Gaegateuninsaeng [lit. "Shitty Life"])	B.I	B.I; Sihwang; Kim Chang-hoon; Park Jae-jun	Sihwang; Kim Chang-hoon; Park Jae-jun; Millennium	3:07
10.	"Cloud Thought" (구르믄; Gureumeun [lit. "Clouds are"])	B.I	B.I; basecamp	basecamp	3:16
11.	"Lover"	B.I	B.I; Padi; NE:ON	Padi	3:03
12.	"Truth"	B.I	B.I; Sihwang; Millennium	Sihwang; Millennium	2:37
13.	"Flame"	B.I	B.I; Millennium; Sihwang	Millennium	2:58
14.	"Michelangelo"	B.I	B.I; Millennium; Sihwang	Millennium; Sihwang	3:08
15.	"Alive"	B.I	B.I; Padi	Padi	2:54
Total length:					45:59

== Charts ==
=== Weekly charts ===
Weekly chart performance for To Die For
Chart (2023)	Peak position
South Korean Albums (Circle)	12

=== Monthly charts ===
Monthly chart performance for To Die For
Chart (2023)	Position
South Korean Albums (Circle)	39

== Personnel ==
Credits are adapted from the album's liner notes.

=== Production ===
- B.I – executive producer
- Stay Tuned – mixing
- Vincent Park – mixing ("To Die", "Truth")
- Sunwoo – mixing ("Cloud Thought")
- Chris Gehringer – mastering
- Will Quinnell – mastering ("Dare to Love")

=== Additional personnel ===
- Hyejin Sim – production director
- Sumin Oh – creative lab
- Haneul Kim – creative lab
- Inseo Yeo – creative lab
- Hosua Yoh – global A&R
- Wonsun Lee – global A&R
- Dongho Yang – global A&R
- Nalim Cho – contents studio
- Nick.K – management
- Nany Kim – episode film director
- Nikolai Ahn – photograph
- Woojae Lee – behind scene photograph
- Minjeong Kim – album design
- Hoyeon Moon – promotion design
- Jungtae Kim – promotion design
- Fwanwook Jung – styling
- Mincheol Jang – styling assistant
- Sohee Kim – hair
- Soyeon Park – hair assistant
- Jingyeon Yeo – hair assistant
- Hangyeol Noh – make-up
- Gayeon Yo – make-up assistant
- Youngbeen – choreographer ("Die for Love")
- ChillLit – choreographer ("Dare to Love")

== Release history ==
Release dates and formats for To Die For
Region	Date	Format(s)	Edition(s)	Label
Various	June 1, 2023	Digital download; streaming	Standard	131
South Korea	June 1, 2023	CD	Standard	131
