= Love or Loved Part.2 =

- Digital cover

EP by B.I
- Released: November 10, 2023
- Length: 14:33
- Languages: English; Korean
- Labels: 131; Transparent Arts

B.I chronology
To Die For (2023)	Love or Loved Part.2 (2023)	Tadaima (2024)

Singles from Love or Loved Part.2
- 1. "4 Letters" Released: September 29, 2023; 2. "Loved" Released: October 27, 2023

Love or Loved Part.2 is the second extended play by South Korean rapper and singer-songwriter B.I, released by 131 and Transparent Arts on November 10, 2023. It is the second and last part of B.I's Love or Loved global album project, after the EP Love or Loved Part.1, released on November 18, 2022. It consists of five tracks, including the singles "4 Letters" and "Loved", which were respectively released on September 29 and October 27, 2023.

== Background ==
B.I's global album project Love or Loved was first introduced through a video teaser released in April 2022. The singer-songwriter explained later on that he wanted to talk about different aspects of love through this project: "the start of love, the breaking up of love, all the stages of love". So that the message would be clearer, he chose to divide the album into two EPs, the first one telling stories about "love", the second one exploring the "loved" side. B.I described the feelings associated with the latter as "a kind of loneliness and sadness and a little bit of emptiness".

After the release of the first EP, Love or Loved Part.1, on November 18, 2022, B.I's label, 131, announced in February 2023 that Love or Loved Part.2 would be released after his second full length album, in the second half of the year. B.I's second album, To Die For, came out on June 1, 2023. In July 2023, 131 published a poster hinting at an October comeback for Love or Loved Part.2. The detailed schedule was revealed at the beginning of September 2023, announcing the release of two singles on September 29 and October 27, followed by the EP itself on November 10, 2023.

== Release and promotion ==
Love or Loved Part.2 was released on November 10, 2023. Two months before, on September 10, 2023, B.I unveiled the title track "Loved" during the 2023 edition of the festival Lollapalooza in Berlin. Between September 19 and October 19, 2023, he embarked on his first Europe tour, Love or Die, performing in 16 cities across 14 European countries. Most of the stops were sold-out, and Joseph Kocharian wrote in his five-stars review for Rolling Stone UK that the concert in London was a "masterclass of live performance". The unreleased songs from Love or Loved Part.2 were part of the set list of the tour.

The second track of the EP, "4 Letters", was released on digital music platforms halfway through the tour, on September 29, 2023. The single featured Filipino-Australian singer James Reid.

"Loved" was released shortly after the end of the tour, on October 27, 2023, along with a music video. Subsequently, from October 31 to November 9, each of the four other tracks was successively introduced through a poster quoting a few lines of the song, and a short video teaser featuring B.I.

== Track listing ==
Love or Loved Part.2 track listing (digital)
No.	Title	Length
1.	"Loved"	2:36
2.	"4 Letters" (featuring James Reid)	3:01
3.	"Alone" (featuring Tytan)	3:02
4.	"S.O.S"	2:49
5.	"All Shook Up" (featuring Agnez Mo)	3:04
Total length:		14:33

Love or Loved Part.2 track listing (CD)
No.	Title	Lyrics	Music	Arrangement	Length
1.	"Loved"	B.I; Mark Johns	Omer Fedi; AO Beats	Fedi; AO Beats	2:38
2.	"4 Letters"	B.I; Jake Torrey; Jesse Fink	Nick Lee; Mason Sacks	Lee; Sacks	2:47
3.	"Alone"	B.I	B.I; Padi	Padi	3:05
4.	"S.O.S"	B.I	B.I; Stally	Stally	2:51
5.	"All Shook Up"	B.I; Dalton Diel	B.I; Lee; Jordan Reifkind	Lee; Reifkind	3:03
Total length:					14:26

== Personnel ==
Credits are adapted from the album's liner notes.

=== Production ===
- B.I – executive producer
- Aaron Mattes – mixing ("Loved", "4 Letters", "All Shook Up")
- Tiernan Cranny – mastering ("Loved", "4 Letters", "All Shook Up")
- Sunwoo – mixing ("Alone", "S.O.S")
- Chris Gehringer – mastering ("Alone", "S.O.S")

=== Additional personnel ===
- Hyejin Sim – production director
- Sumin Oh – head of creative part
- Sungwoo Jung – A&R
- Haneul Kim – A&R
- Daeun Choi – marketing
- Nalim Cho – contents studio
- Juyun Bang – contents studio
- Hosua Yoh – global business
- Wonsun Lee – global business
- Dongho Yang – global business
- Nick.K – management
- Transparent Arts – global management
- Wonder – global management
- Byul Yun – music video director
- Jangdukhwa – photography
- Jiyong Yoon – music video photography
- Wonyoung Ki – music video photography assistant
- Minhyung Jun – music video photography assistant
- Jungtae Kim – physical design director
- Hyein Yang – physical design director assistant
- Hoyeon Moon – promotion design
- Fwanwook Jung – styling
- Mincheol Jang – styling assistant
- Kyeongmin Choi – album jacket hair
- Sohee Kim – music video hair
- Hangyeol Noh – make-up

== Charts ==
Chart performance for Love or Loved Part.2
Chart (2023)	Peak position
South Korean Albums (Circle)	18

== Release history ==
Release dates and formats for Love or Loved Part.2
Region	Date	Format(s)	Edition(s)	Label	Ref.
Various	November 10, 2023	Digital download; streaming	—N/a	131; Transparent Arts	
South Korea	November 10, 2023	CD	Asia edition: "Letter" version, "Photo book" version	131; Transparent Arts	
United States	November 10, 2023	CD	U.S. edition: "Analogue" version	131; Transparent Arts	
