= Midnight Blue (Love Streaming) =

Single album by B.I
- Released: March 19, 2021
- Genre: Ballad
- Length: 9:56
- Language: Korean
- Label: 131 Label; IOK Music
- Producer: B.I

B.I chronology
Midnight Blue (Love Streaming) (2021)	Waterfall (2021)

Singles from Midnight Blue (Love Streaming)
- 1. "Midnight Blue (Donation Project)" Released: March 19, 2021

Midnight Blue (Love Streaming) (Korean: 깊은 밤의 위로 (Love Streaming)) is a charity single album by South Korean rapper, singer, songwriter, record producer and dancer B.I. It was released on March 19, 2021, by 131 Label X IOK Music, and distributed by Dreamus. The debut single album contains three songs, including the lead single "Midnight Blue", all written and co-composed by B.I. Midnight Blue (Love Streaming) is a donation project, with all of the proceeds of the sound sources, recordings, and copyright fees of the single album being donated to World Vision, to support children in crisis across the globe.

== Background ==
On March 15, 2021, 131 Label announced the release of the debut single album of B.I with a surprise teaser via their official YouTube channel. The teaser clip featured an animated character, presumably a representation of B.I himself, explaining what the song is about through the use of sign language.

"Midnight Blue" is a song that gives a warm embrace to the audience with a calm piano melody and warm vocal tone," says the animated character in sign language, according to the video's YouTube description. "Like the lyrics 'I will cover your heart with a blanket in the dark midnight', hope this track can be a comfort to anyone who is enduring its wound alone."

The three-track single album is written and composed by B.I, with collaborations from other producers on compositions and arrangements. All the tracks were released partially as demos via B.I's SoundCloud over the course of 2020–2021.

== Release and promotion ==
All the promotions before the release were handled through the social media accounts of 131 Label. A surprise teaser for the "Midnight Blue (Donation Project)" music video was released on March 15, 2021. A project poster was released on March 16, 2021. Then, on March 17, 2021, the album was made available for pre-order. 131 label announced that the donation album is limitedly produced to 10,000 physical albums only.

The single album was released to digital music and streaming platforms on March 19, 2021, alongside an animated music video for the lead single "Midnight Blue". The single album's CDs were released the same day.

== Philanthropy ==
After learning about the emergency relief child support project through World Vision (a humanitarian aid, development, and advocacy organization) in early 2021, B.I decided to carry out the Midnight Blue (Love Streaming) donation project in the hope to convey the warmth of the world through music. He pledged to donate all the proceeds of the sound sources, recordings, and copyright fees to World Vision's domestic and international relief efforts for children in crisis.

On May 4, 2021, B.I personally met with chairman Cho Myung-hwan at the World Vision Office (an NGO) in Seoul, to donate all the profits from the sale of 10,000 limited edition single albums of Midnight Blue (Love Streaming). In addition, B.I promised to continuously donate all the revenue from the digital music sales and copyright fees that the single album would accrue.

== Critical reception ==
Professional ratings
Review scores
Source	Rating
NME	4/5 stars

NME stated that "B.I manages to imbue the song with layered emotional states and perspectives, shifting from reflection ("Having grown up too fast / Our hearts are too fragile") to consolation ("I'll pretend I don't know / So go ahead and cry") and even despair ("Everyone seems to live like that, with a bruised heart"). His delicate vocals are able to convey a comforting assurance, though this is briefly broken during the song's midpoint with a sudden switch to a harsher rap voice that pierces the gentle cadence. Thankfully, he’s able to refine that balance and make the transitions more seamless as the EP progresses."

== Commercial performance ==
All three songs featured on B.I's single album Midnight Blue (Love Streaming) debuted on Billboard's World Digital Song Sales chart. "Midnight Blue" charted at #14, followed by "Blossom" at #17, and "Remember Me" at #18. In South Korea, Midnight Blue (Love Streaming) debuted at #14 on the Gaon Album Chart.

== Track listing ==
Midnight Blue (Love Streaming) track listing
No.	Title	Lyrics	Music	Arrangement	Length
1.	"Midnight Blue" (깊은 밤의 위로; Gipeun Bamui Wiro [lit. "Consolation of the Deep Night"]) (Donation Project)	B.I	B.I; Kim Chang Hoon	Kim Chang Hoon	3:44
2.	"Remember Me" (Donation Project)	B.I; Sihwang	B.I; Sihwang	Sihwang	2:40
3.	"Blossom" (내 걱정; Nae Geokjeong [lit. "My worries"]) (Donation Project)	B.I	B.I; Padi; General Sound	Padi	3:31
Total length:					09:56

== Charts ==
Weekly chart performance for Midnight Blue (Love Streaming)
Chart (2021)	Peak position
South Korea (Gaon)	14

Monthly chart performance for Midnight Blue (Love Streaming)
Chart (2021)	Peak position
South Korean Albums (Gaon)	60

== Release history ==
Release dates and formats for Midnight Blue (Love Streaming)
Region	Date	Format(s)	Edition(s)	Label	Ref.
Various	March 19, 2021	Digital download; streaming	Standard	131 Label x IOK Music	
South Korea	March 19, 2021	CD (1 version)	Limited: 10,000 copies	131 Label x IOK Music	
