= Love or Loved Part.1 =

- Digital cover

EP by B.I
- Released: November 18, 2022
- Genre: Pop; EDM; R&B
- Length: 16:00
- Language: Korean; English
- Label: 131; Transparent Arts
- Producer: B.I

B.I chronology
Cosmos (2021)	Love or Loved Part.1 (2022)	To Die For (2023)

Singles from Love or Loved Part.1
- 1. "BTBT" Released: May 13, 2022; 2. "Keep Me Up" Released: November 18, 2022

Love or Loved Part.1 is the first extended play by South Korean rapper and singer-songwriter B.I, released by 131 and Transparent Arts on November 18, 2022. This EP is the first half of B.I's global album project Love or Loved [L.O.L], and consists of five tracks, including the singles "BTBT" and "Keep Me Up". "BTBT" had been previously released on May 13, 2022, by IOK and Transparent Arts.

Love or Loved Part.1 tells stories of youthful love. B.I collaborated with the Stereotypes and other U.S.-based producers, who created the beats and melodies for three of the EP's five songs. B.I co-composed the remaining two tracks and wrote or co-wrote the lyrics of all the songs.

== Background ==
In an interview published on April 8, 2022, B.I revealed that he would be "releasing a single soon", followed by an EP. While talking about the upcoming single, B.I added, "I wrapped up filming my music video. There are some super shocking scenes that we worked on. All I can tell you is that I literally almost fainted shooting some of these scenes". Shortly after, at 00:00 KST on April 21, 2022, B.I's label, 131, announced his 2022 global album project. The YouTube video associated with the announcement showed that the project included a pre-release single and two EPs. On May 2, 2022, it was announced that the first pre-release single would be released on May 13, 2022, and on May 5, it was revealed that that single was "BTBT", a collaboration with American rapper and record producer Soulja Boy, featuring South Korean hip-hop soloist DeVita.

On September 26, 2022, a few months after the release of "BTBT", 131 published a poster stating that the first EP under the global album project, titled Love or Loved Part.1, would be released in November. The exact date – November 18, 2022 – and the titles of the tracks were announced during the first week of October.

"BTBT" was jointly published by IOK and Transparent Arts, as 131 was affiliated with IOK Music at the time. The EP was released by 131 and Transparent Arts after B.I resigned his executive director position at IOK and reformed 131 as an independent label.

B.I has described his global album project Love or Loved as an exploration into love – "the start of love, the breaking up of love, all the stages of love". The singer-songwriter developed that theme in his music videos through "a futuristic concept focused on the youth living in it, their love stories and rebellious moments". He chose to split the album into two parts so that each EP would convey a clear message. The first part, Love or Loved Part.1, represents the "love" side of the project. B.I described it as "powerful, loving, sweet". The second part, Love or Loved Part.2, was released one year later, on November 10, 2023. It discusses the "loved" side, "heartbreak, loneliness and emptiness". B.I explained that he felt that the opposite of love was neither "I don't like you" nor "I don't love you anymore", but rather "I loved you before" or "the absence of love".

== Production ==
The first three tracks of Love or Loved Part.1 – "BTBT", "Keep Me Up" and "Middle with You" – contain English verses and were co-written by B.I along with lyricists from the U.S. After the release of "BTBT", B.I explained that he was currently studying English because he wanted to write songs entirely in English by himself in the future.

Through his global album project, B.I also intended to challenge himself by working with different producers and "tak[ing] on new styles of music". The U.S.-based production team the Stereotypes, with whom B.I had already collaborated with for the single "Got It like That", composed "BTBT" and "Keep Me Up", along with 9am. Nick Lee and Jake Herring composed "Middle with You". For B.I, this was an opportunity to learn from "their styles and processes of making music". He also revealed he had developed a new way to use his voice for this EP, changing his tone, pronunciation and accent. In contrast to his previous albums, Love or Loved Part.1 showcases B.I's singing more than his rapping. "While I'm a rapper, I'm also a producer, dancer and singer", he said. "With every single album, one particular side may stand out more."

The lyrics of the last two tracks – "Tangerine" and "Endless Summer" – are in Korean except for a few lines. They were written by B.I and co-composed with producers who had arranged some of his songs in the past.

== Lyrics and music ==
B.I compared the five songs of Love or Loved Part.1 to stories. Each of them tells different aspects of youthful love, whether "situations being in love can put you in" or "emotions ... associated with the world of love". Overall, they show love as "something that we devote ourselves to despite the fact that we know that it has an end". B.I stated that the message is "let's fall in love and completely dive into feelings we may grow to be cautious of as we get older".

The opening song of the EP is the pre-release single "BTBT", whose title is derived from a Korean word that means "to stagger". According to B.I, the song talks about the "passionate feelings you get when you meet somebody or start a relationship, to be drunk with love" and, more generally, about the "powerful and rebellious kind of love we experience in our adolescence".

"Keep Me Up", the second song and promoted single of the EP, is "about fierce love, but at the same time embodies the loneliness of the person who sings. Like wandering around looking for love to fill an empty heart". B.I also explained that "Keep Me Up" depicts "an instinctual desire and thirst that we all have".

B.I described the third song, "Middle with You", as a "cute and fresh" declaration of love, reminiscent of the color pink. Yet, he also called it a "more mature" song than "Keep Me Up", expressing an older narrator's wish to escape from everything through an innocent love.

The fourth song, "Tangerine", was inspired by the movie Eternal Sunshine of the Spotless Mind. The song talks about choosing to love despite knowing that a relationship is likely to fail. It was named after a line from the movie, when the female protagonist, Clementine, dyes her hair orange and the main male character, Joel, calls her "Tangerine". The line "Okay, okay, okay, okay, okay" in the second verse is also a quote, from the single word "OK" said by Joel in the last scene of the film, after a fight with Clementine.

For the fifth and last track, "Endless Summer", B.I drew inspiration from another movie, Eternal Summer, which he remembered as "blue, like a bruise" with "a damp scent, like a damp summer beach and the smell of the ocean". The song was also inspired by a poem which, according to him, "is about not counting the age with days that go by, but only the summers that one spends with their loved one, because those are the only days the person has been truly themselves".

Musically, Love or Loved Part.1 brings together a variety of genres and sounds to tell its stories. "Keep Me Up" was introduced as a latin pop track. Critics heard EDM and tropical influences in "Endless Summer". "Middle with You" was said to be pop music. "BTBT" was described by NME as a "sensuous R&B song, underlined by prominent bass and the syncopations of percussion". Other music writers also mentioned a "latin-inspired progression" and Afrobeats drums.

== Artwork and packaging ==
B.I and 131's creative team produced two distinctive types of packaging for the EP. The main component of the Real Pack version is a life-size photograph of the singer-songwriter. The Card Pack version contains an actual deck of French-suited playing cards, building on a gaming concept that was also described by B.I as a "key aspect of the story" for the music videos of "BTBT" and "Keep Me Up". Additionally, the playing cards convey the idea of love through photographs of B.I and love-related symbols, notably the recurring image of a rose, generally black and at times burning. In some pictures, the artist himself embodies the flower.

== Release and promotion ==
A music video for "BTBT" was released on May 13, 2022, at 00:00 KST, prior to the release of the single. The latter became available on digital music and streaming platforms on the same day at 13:00 KST. A dance performance film, in collaboration with and choreographed by South Korean dance crew Aitty Too (82) was released on May 18, 2022, at 00:00 KST.

The EP was released on digital music platforms on November 18, 2022, at 14:00 KST. A music video for the single "Keep Me Up" came out concurrently, showcasing choreography by Aitty Too members Youngbeen, Shawn and Beom.

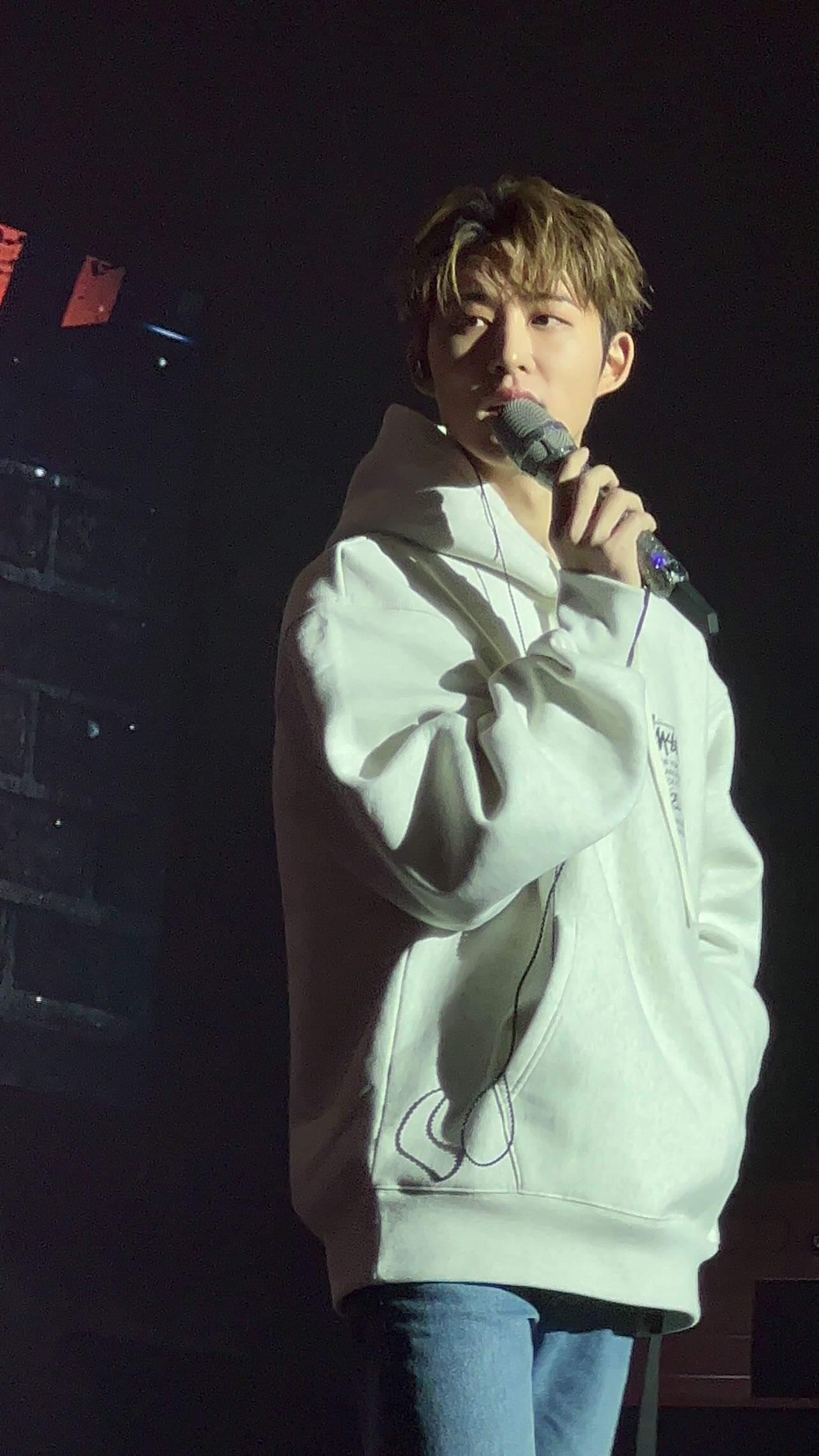
B.I during the soundcheck before his concert on December 10, 2022

As a part of the global project promotion, 131 introduced "B.I 2022 Global Album Project Documentary" on May 3, 2022, at 00:00 KST, with a teaser titled But hard work alone isn't enough of a reason for praise. The documentary for "BTBT", I'll master the unknown and prove it to you, with B.I confessing his despairs and dreams, was released at 00:00 KST on May 22, 2022.

On November 23, 2022, 131 announced the upcoming release of live clips for each track, a dance practice video for the single "Keep Me Up", and a documentary film for Love or Loved Part.1. The first part of the latter, That one cannot exist without the other, was released on B.I's YouTube channel at 00:00 KST on December 2, 2022. The second part, Don't ever give up on love above all else, was released one week later.

B.I performed "BTBT" in public for the first time during the BTBT Guerrilla Showcase, which was held in Seoul on May 28, 2022. On June 26, 2022, he sang "BTBT" and unveiled "Tangerine" and "Endless Summer" during his online event BTBT Performance Online Fancon. He also promoted "BTBT" through Arirang TV's music program Simply K-Pop Con-Tour in June and July 2022 (episodes 524 to 527). From July to September 2022, he performed at fan meetings and festivals in South Korea and across Southeast Asia. Following the release of Love or Loved Part.1, B.I held his first offline concert since his debut as a soloist, All Day Show [L.O.L: The Hidden Stage], in Seoul on December 10, 2022. He performed all the songs from the EP during the event. In March 2023, he embarked on the L.O.L: The Hidden Stage tour, with six stops in Southeast and East Asia.

In connection with his global album project, B.I collaborated with Ojeito and Arena Embroidery on a series of limited edition bags, titled "the pieces of love". Several "chapters" became successively available starting from August 2022.

== Commercial performance ==
Love or Loved Part.1 charted for five weeks on Circle Chart's album chart upon release, peaking at 11 in the second week. More than 30,000 physical copies were sold through retailers whose sales count towards South Korean charts.

The songs of Love or Loved Part.1 reached 100 millions total streams on the global music platform Spotify in February 2023. "BTBT" also reached 100 million total streams on its own in May 2023, about one year after its release. Its dance performance film had also been watched more than 50 millions times on YouTube as of March 2023.

== Track listing ==
Credits are adapted from the album's liner notes (Card Pack version). Less detailed credits are also available in the Korea Music Copyright Association's database.

Love or Loved Part.1 track listing
No.	Title	Lyrics	Music	Arrangement	Length
1.	"BTBT" (with Soulja Boy, featuring DeVita)	B.I; Soulja Boy; 3onawav; Ale Alberti	The Stereotypes; 9am	The Stereotypes; 9am	3:39
2.	"Keep Me Up"	B.I; 3onawav; Catherine Lee	The Stereotypes; 9am	The Stereotypes; 9am	3:26
3.	"Middle with You"	B.I; Nick Lee; Jake Herring	Nick Lee; Jake Herring	Nick Lee	2:58
4.	"Tangerine"	B.I	B.I; Saint Leonard	Saint Leonard	3:18
5.	"Endless Summer"	B.I	B.I; Kim Chang-hoon	Kim Chang-hoon	2:37
Total length:					16:00

== Charts ==
=== Weekly charts ===
Weekly chart performance for Love or Loved Part.1
Chart (2022)	Peak position
South Korean Albums (Circle)	11
Japan Download Albums (Billboard Japan)	54

=== Monthly charts ===
Monthly chart performance for Love or Loved Part.1
Chart (2022)	Peak position
South Korean Albums (Circle)	26

== Personnel ==
Credits are adapted from the album's liner notes.

=== Production ===
- B.I – executive producer
- Aaron Mattes – mixing ("Keep Me Up", "BTBT", "Middle with You")
- Tiernan Cranny – mastering ("Keep Me Up", "BTBT", "Middle with You")
- Sunwoo – mixing ("Tangerine", "Endless Summer")
- Chris Gehringer – mastering ("Tangerine", "Endless Summer")

No one is officially credited for recording Love or Loved Part.1. However, the documentary film That one cannot exist without the other includes some footage of B.I handling it himself.

=== Additional personnel ===
- Hyejin Sim – production director
- Sumin Oh – A&R
- Haneul Kim – A&R
- Jinwoo Yang – A&R
- Hosua Yoh – global A&R
- Wonsun Lee – global A&R
- Nick.K – management
- Inseo Yeo – management
- Transparent Arts – global management
- Wonder – global management
- Nalim Cho – music video director ("Keep Me Up"), performance film director ("BTBT"), contents studio
- Daniel Ho Jung – contents studio
- Ambience – music video post production, concept film production
- Hiijack – concept film director
- Lee Suho – music video director ("BTBT")
- Jangdukhwa – photography
- Kimheejune – photography
- Jungtae Kim – design director
- Hyunji Kim – design director assistant
- Seunghwi Yu – tattoo drawing
- Fwanwook Jung – styling
- Mincheol Jang – styling assistant
- Sohee Kim – hair
- Soyeon Park – hair assistant
- Hangyeol Noh – make-up
- Yeeun Lee – make-up assistant
- Lisa Jarvis – music video styling ("BTBT")
- Gregory Kara – music video styling customization ("BTBT")
- Keko Hainswheeler – music video styling customization ("BTBT")
- Gwanghyo Yun – music video hair ("BTBT")
- Youmin Kim – music video hair assistant ("BTBT")
- Youngbeen – choreography ("BTBT", "Keep Me Up")
- Shawn – choreography ("BTBT", "Keep Me Up")
- Beom – choreography ("BTBT", "Keep Me Up")
- Jinwoo – choreography ("BTBT")
- Tarzan – choreography ("BTBT")
- Xin Seoul – promotion photography ("BTBT")
- Sewoong Jung – executive adviser

== Release history ==
Release dates and formats for Love or Loved Part.1
Region	Date	Format(s)	Edition(s)	Label	Ref.
Various	November 18, 2022	Digital download; streaming	Standard	131, Transparent Arts	
South Korea	November 18, 2022	CD (Asia edition, 2 versions: Real Pack, Card Pack)	Standard	131, Transparent Arts	
United States	November 18, 2022	CD (U.S. edition, 2 versions: Real Pack, Card Pack)	Standard	131, Transparent Arts	
