= Cosmos (B.I album) =

- Digital cover

Studio album (half) by B.I
- Released: November 11, 2021
- Studios: Tone Studio, Seoul, South Korea
- Length: 22:25
- Language: Korean
- Label: IOK M
- Producer: B.I

B.I chronology
Waterfall (2021)	Cosmos (2021)	Love or Loved Part.1 (2022)

Singles from Cosmos
- 1. "Cosmos" Released: November 11, 2021

Cosmos is the first half of the second studio album, To Die For, by South Korean rapper, singer, songwriter, record producer and dancer B.I. The half album was released on November 11, 2021, by IOK M, and distributed by Dreamus. It contains 7 songs including the lead single of the same name, "Cosmos", all written and co-composed by B.I. According to B.I, Cosmos is about resistance and love, the feeling that one can only feel at young age. It shows different aspects of youth in the MV and music. Cosmos was preceded by B.I's debut studio album Waterfall, released in June 2021.

== Background ==
On October 18, 2021, B.I announced that his new album will be released on November 11, exclusively to his fans via his official fan cafe. On October 22, 2021, at midnight KST, 131 Label announced the release of B.I's half album Cosmos with a teaser titled "What Is Your COSMOS?". According to the video’s YouTube description, Cosmos explores “the love that makes me dream about eternity and to give everything without anything in return”. The 7-track half album is all written and composed by B.I, with collaborations from other producers on compositions and arrangements. The album features K-R&B singer Colde (on "Nerd"). An idyllic music video for the title track "Cosmos" was also released alongside the album.

B.I stated in an interview that, "Cosmos is an album like a question about unfading love that makes me dream of eternity and keeps me alive".

== Release and promotion ==
All the promotions before the release were handled through the social media accounts of 131 Label and IOK Music. On October 23, 2021, at midnight KST, B.I's team released a detailed "plan poster" that outlined what fans can expect in the weeks leading up to his comeback. This included two message films, outlining the message of each of the tracks of the album, excluding the last track "Buddy Buddy". In addition, three message and six lyric concept posters were released. The first message, Keep the Fire Alive, tells the story of passion and power for life. The second message, Uncertainty, the Beauty of Youth, contains the meaning that if youth is a period of burning passion and will for life, it is also uncertain, and the youthful and young love is also a beautiful moment. The third message, We All Live In One's Cosmos, means someone's cosmos while everyone is living, and the cosmos is expressed as the meaning of eternity and the universe.

B.I held a live broadcast via YouTube, 1 hour prior to the new album release.

The first six tracks of the album were released to digital music and streaming platforms on November 11, 2021. The seventh track "Buddy Buddy" was exclusively available on CD only, but was later released digitally to all streaming platforms on December 23, 2021. The album's CDs were made available for pre-order prior to the album release, and were released on November 11, 2021 as well. Three different versions of the CDs are available, Moon, Star and Earth.

== Critical reception ==
Professional ratings
Review scores
Source	Rating
NME	4/5 stars

NME granted Cosmos a four stars rating, stating that, "With every release, B.I continues to blaze through his own creative stratosphere, his artistic bravado long taking him light years ahead of his peers. This multifaceted artist may have started his 'Cosmos' expedition in search of love and passion, but his discoveries ended up becoming as vast as its namesake; among them, a desire to be a voice for the youth."

Teen Vogue and MTV News included the title track, "Cosmos", in their respective "Best New Music Friday" and "Bop Shop" selections for the week of November 12, 2021. Highlighting the contrast between its "sweet, romantic lyrics" and its "high-energy melody filled with strong drum beats and retro electric guitar sounds" reminiscent of '80s rock, the latter called the song an "effervescent title track" that "introduces fans to B.I's new world and marks the start of a fun, interesting, and spirited comeback."

== Track listing ==
Cosmos track listing
No.	Title	Lyrics	Music	Arrangement	Length
1.	"Alive"	B.I	B.I; Padi	Padi	2:54
2.	"Nineteen" (열아홉; Yeorahop [lit. "Nineteen"])	B.I	B.I; Saint Leonard	Saint Leonard	3:20
3.	"Cosmos"	B.I	B.I; Sihwang; Millennium	Sihwang; Millennium; Park Jae Jun	3:37
4.	"Nerd" (featuring Colde)	B.I; Sihwang	B.I; Millennium; Sihwang	Millennium; Sihwang	3:07
5.	"Lover"	B.I	B.I; Padi; NE:ON	Padi	3:03
6.	"Flame"	B.I	B.I; Millennium; Sihwang	Millennium	2:58

Special Bonus Track
No.	Title	Lyrics	Music	Arrangement	Length
7.	"Buddy Buddy" (친구해요; Chinguhaeyo [lit. "Let's be Friends"])	B.I	B.I; Kim Chang Hoon; Jeon Hyun Myung	Kim Chang Hoon; Jeon Hyun Myung	3:23
Total length:					22:25

== Charts ==
Weekly chart performance for Cosmos
Chart (2021)	Peak position
South Korean Albums (Gaon)	5

Monthly chart performance for Cosmos
Chart (2021)	Peak position
South Korean Albums (Gaon)	17

== Personnel ==
Credits are adapted from the album's liner notes.

=== Production ===
- B.I – executive producer
- Lee Seung-jun – recording
- Stay Tuned – mixing
- Chris Gehringer – mastering

=== Additional personnel ===
- Sim Hye-jin – production director
- Oh Su-min – A&R
- Kim Ha-neul – A&R
- Lim Da-hye – content planning
- Jung Ye-jing – content planning
- Hosua Yoh – global A&R
- Yang Jin-woo – global A&R
- Nick.K – management
- Kim Woogie – music video director
- Lee Hye-in – track film director
- AFF – live performance film director
- Kimheejune – photography, promotion photography
- Yoon Song-yi – photography
- Narae – album design
- Jung Fwan-wook – styling
- Jang Min-cheol – styling assistant
- Kim So-hee – hair
- Choi Hyeon-sung – hair assistant
- Park So-yeon – hair assistant
- Noh Hang-yeol – make-up
- Cho Soo-bin – make-up assistant
- Park Min-jae – make-up assistant
- Youngbeen – choreography
- Xin Seoul – promotion photography
- Jang Jin-woo – executive adviser
- Kim Sung-tae – executive supervisor

== Release history ==
Release dates and formats for Cosmos
Region	Date	Format(s)	Edition(s)	Label	Ref.
Various	November 11, 2021	Digital download; streaming	Standard	IOK M	
South Korea	November 11, 2021	CD (3 versions: Moon, Star and Earth)	Standard	IOK M	
