= Destiny Rogers =

American singer and songwriter

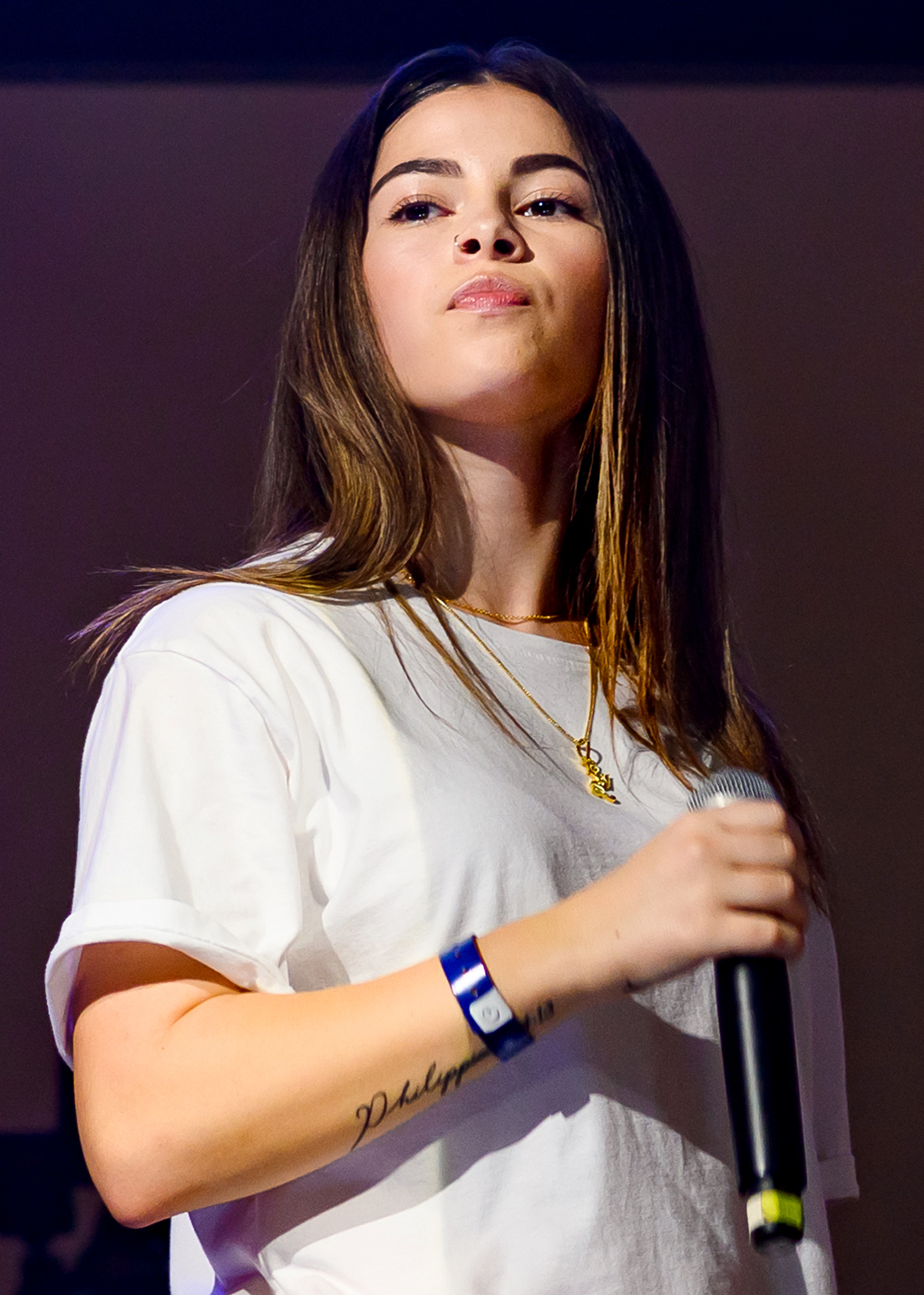
- Rogers in 2019

Background information
- Born: September 13, 1999 (age 27)
- Genres: R&B; pop
- Occupations: Singer; songwriter
- Instruments: Vocals; guitar; piano; drums
- Years active: 2018–present
- Labels: Beach Wave Sound; RCA
- Website: destinyrogers.com

Destiny Rogers (born September 13, 1999) is an American singer from Lodi, California. Rogers has released three extended plays: Tomboy (2019) led by the single "Tomboy,” Great Escape and Be Kind Rewind in 2026.

== Early life ==
Rogers grew up in the small town of Lodi, California. Rogers is fluent in Spanish from growing up in a Mexican household through her mother's side of the family. She learned to play guitar at the age of 10 from watching YouTube videos of Justin Bieber play. Rogers grew up in the Pentecostal church where her dad has been a worship leader for 30 years; she was active in the church community in her youth and performed in the band during church services. Rogers went to a non-traditional, independent high school so she could focus on singing and songwriting. She moved to Los Angeles in January 2019 for her music career.

== Musical career ==
In 2017, a family friend showed Rogers' cover on YouTube to production duo The Stereotypes, which led them to working together. Rogers subsequently spent one weekend a month in Los Angeles to work on music with them for two years. She signed with their label in February 2018 and RCA Records in November. Her music influences are Justin Bieber, H.E.R., Kehlani, and Billie Eilish.

On February 28, 2019, Rogers released her debut single "Tomboy," following recording in mid-2018. Lyrically, the song is about "defying expectations" and inspiring women to be confident. A music video was filmed in Rogers' hometown with footage of her skateboarding and was released with the song. Professional skater, Mariah Duran, also flew out to appear in the video. Rogers released her debut EP, Tomboy, produced by The Stereotypes on March 22, 2019, after recording for two years. Music videos for the EP songs "North$ide" and "Lockdown" were also released.

Rogers performed at the 2019 South by Southwest and 2019 Camp Flog Gnaw Carnival. In the fall of 2019, she opened for singer Ruel on his Free Time Tour in North America. In December 2019, Rogers participated in a songwriting camp with Alicia Keys. On May 29, 2020, Rogers released her second EP titled Great Escape. The EP was led by singles "Kickin' Pushin'" and "Euphoria."

Singer Lisa from K-Pop group Blackpink released a choreographed music video for "Tomboy" which boosted the song through streaming. The attention prompted Rogers to release a remix of the song with rapper Coi Leray and a new music video in April 2021. In May 2021, Rogers released a single and music video titled "West Like" featuring Kalan.FrFr and a joint single called "Got It Like That" with B.I and Tyla Yaweh.

Rogers co-wrote the track "All or Nothing" on K-Pop singer Nayeon's debut solo project Im Nayeon released on June 24, 2022. On August 18, 2022, Rogers was featured in the remix of Thuy's song "In My Bag". Rogers appeared on James Reid's album Lovescene in the song "Lie to Me." The accompanying music video was filmed in Manila, Philippines and was released on November 16, 2022. Rogers stated near the end of 2022 that she left RCA Records.

== Performances ==
In late 2019, Rogers went on a North American tour with Australian singer Ruel in 2019.

In November 2019, Rogers performed at Tyler, the Creator’s Camp Flog Gnaw Carnival at Dodger Stadium.

In October 2021, Rogers headlined the Plural Music: #AllGenresWelcome Block Party in San Francisco, California.

In October 2021, Rogers and singer Kalan.FrFr performed "West Like" at the Staples Center for the Los Angeles Clippers opening game half-time show.

In late 2021, Rogers toured with American rapper, singer-songwriter Arizona Zervas for his The Road Trip Tour.

In May 2024, Rogers opened for Madison Beer on The Spinnin Tour.

== Personal life ==
On National Coming Out Day in 2022, Rogers publicly came out as bisexual.

== Discography ==
=== Extended plays ===
- Tomboy (2019)
- Great Escape (2020)
- Be Kind Rewind (2026)

=== Albums ===
- "Still Your Girl" (2024)
