= List of songs written by B.I =

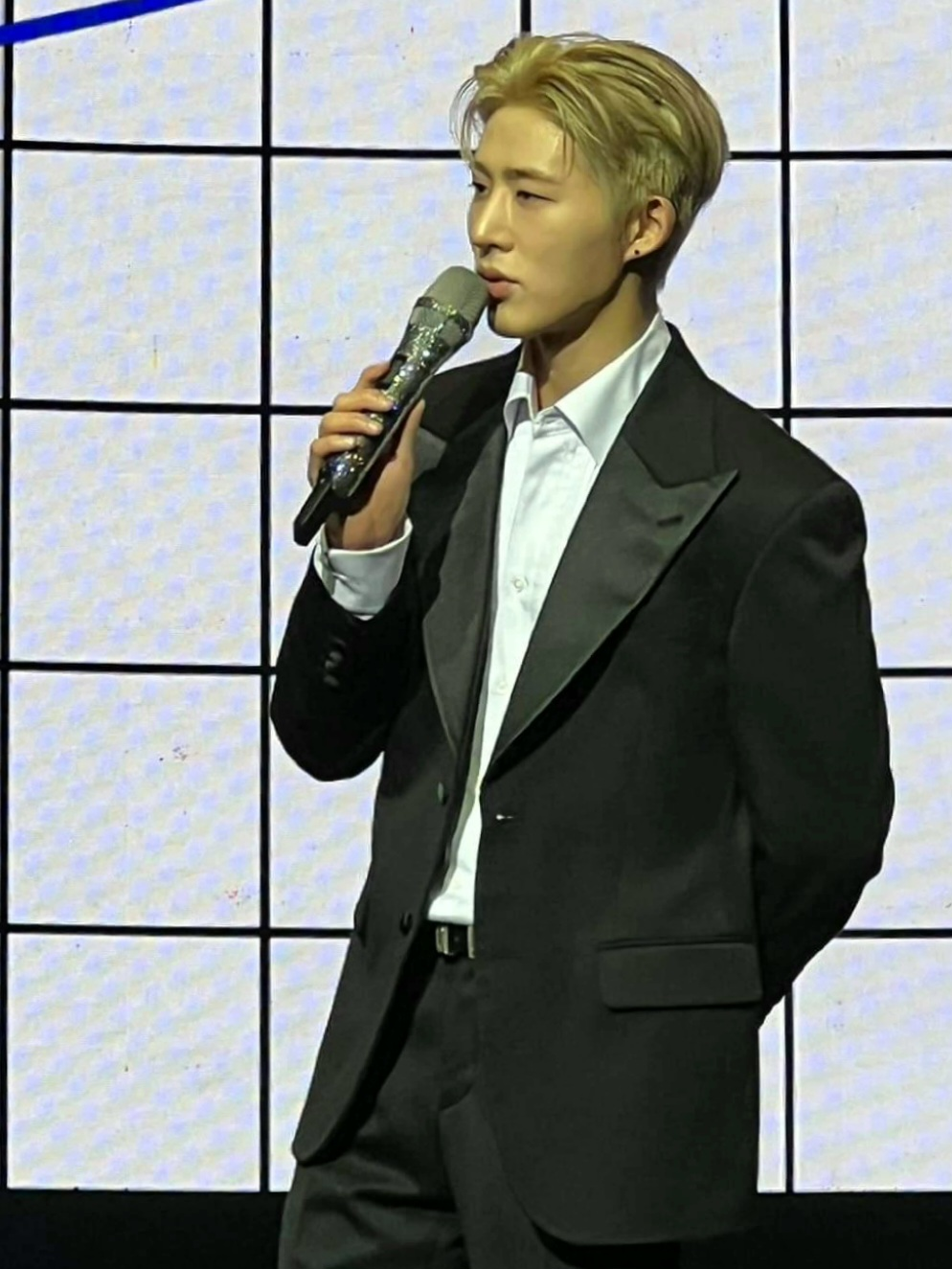
B.I at his first fan meeting (B.I OFFLINE) in Manila on August 27, 2022

Kim Han-bin (Korean: 김한빈; born October 22, 1996), better known by his stage name B.I, is a songwriter, record producer, rapper, singer, and dancer under 131.

B.I played a pivotal role in the production and songwriting of iKon's music during his time as the group's leader, and he is credited as the sole record producer for all of their releases. His contributions to iKon's second studio album, Return, especially for the lead single "Love Scenario", earned him the prestigious "Songwriter of the Year" award at the 2018 Melon Music Awards. At just 22 years old, he became the youngest recipient of the award and the only male idol to have ever won it.

On January 22, 2019, B.I became a full member of the Korea Music Copyright Association (KOMCA). As of March 2026, the KOMCA has 151 songs registered under his name. All song credits are adapted from the KOMCA's database, unless otherwise noted.

== Solo works ==
Year	Artist(s)	Song	Album	Lyrics		Music	
Year	Artist(s)	Song	Album	Credited	With	Credited	With
2014	B.I	"Be I"	Show Me the Money 3 - Part 1	Yes	—	Yes	Choice37
2021	B.I	"Midnight Blue"	Midnight Blue (Love Streaming)	Yes	—	Yes	Kim Chang-hoon
2021	B.I	"Remember Me"	Midnight Blue (Love Streaming)	Yes	Sihwang	Yes	Sihwang
2021	B.I	"Blossom"	Midnight Blue (Love Streaming)	Yes	—	Yes	Padi, General Sound
2021	B.I, Destiny Rogers, Tyla Yaweh	"Got It Like That"	Non-album single	Yes	Mic Kellogg, Destiny Rogers, Tyla Yaweh, Breland	No	—N/a
2021	B.I	"Waterfall"	Waterfall	Yes	—	Yes	Choice37, Hae
2021	B.I	"illa illa"	Waterfall	Yes	—	Yes	Millennium, Kang Uk-jin, Diggy, Sihwang
2021	B.I	"Daydream" (featuring Lee Hi)	Waterfall	Yes	—	Yes	Saint Leonard
2021	B.I	"Numb"	Waterfall	Yes	—	Yes	Stally, Basecamp
2021	B.I	"Illusion"	Waterfall	Yes	—	Yes	JFKID
2021	B.I	"Flow Away"	Waterfall	Yes	—	Yes	Millennium
2021	B.I	"Help Me"	Waterfall	Yes	—	Yes	Millennium, Sihwang
2021	B.I	"Remember Me"	Waterfall	Yes	—	Yes	Millennium
2021	B.I	"Stay" (featuring Tablo)	Waterfall	Yes	Tablo	Yes	Choice37, Hae
2021	B.I	"Gray"	Waterfall	Yes	—	Yes	Kang Uk-jin, Diggy, Eddy
2021	B.I	"Then"	Waterfall	Yes	—	Yes	Padi
2021	B.I	"Re-Birth"	Waterfall	Yes	—	Yes	Sihwang, Millennium
2021	B.I, Bipolar Sunshine, Afgan	"Lost At Sea (Illa Illa 2)"	Non-album single	Yes	Bipolar Sunshine, Afgan, Jiwoo	Yes	Cory Enemy, Ben Samama
2021	B.I	"Alive"	Cosmos	Yes	—	Yes	Padi
2021	B.I	"Nineteen"	Cosmos	Yes	—	Yes	Saint Leonard
2021	B.I	"Cosmos"	Cosmos	Yes	—	Yes	Sihwang, Millennium, Park Jae-jun
2021	B.I	"Nerd" (featuring Colde)	Cosmos	Yes	Sihwang	Yes	Millennium, Sihwang
2021	B.I	"Lover"	Cosmos	Yes	—	Yes	Padi, NE:ON
2021	B.I	"Flame"	Cosmos	Yes	—	Yes	Millennium, Sihwang
2021	B.I	"Buddy Buddy"	Cosmos	Yes	—	Yes	Kim Chang-hoon, Jeon Hyun-myung
2022	B.I, Soulja Boy	"BTBT" (featuring DeVita)	Love or Loved Part.1	Yes	Soulja Boy, 3onawav, Ale Alberti	No	—N/a
2022	B.I, Chuu	"Lullaby"	Non-album single	Yes	Chuu, Vaav	Yes	Kang Uk-jin, Diggy
2022	B.I	"Keep Me Up"	Love or Loved Part.1	Yes	3onawav, Catherine Lee	No	—N/a
2022	B.I	"Middle With You"	Love or Loved Part.1	Yes	Nick Lee	No	—N/a
2022	B.I	"Tangerine"	Love or Loved Part.1	Yes	—	Yes	Saint Leonard
2022	B.I	"Endless Summer"	Love or Loved Part.1	Yes	—	Yes	Kim Chang-hoon
2023	B.I, Sik-K, Reddy	"TTM"	Non-album single	Yes	Sik-K, Reddy	Yes	Millennium
2023	B.I	"To Die"	To Die For	Yes	—	Yes	Padi
2023	B.I	"Wave" (featuring Kid Milli, Lil Cherry)	To Die For	Yes	Kid Milli, Lil Cherry	Yes	Millennium, Sihwang, Kim Chang-hoon
2023	B.I	"The Island of Misfit Toys"	To Die For	Yes	—	Yes	Millennium, Sihwang
2023	B.I	"Die For Love" (featuring Jessi)	To Die For	Yes	Jessi	Yes	Padi, Millennium, Sihwang, Kim Chang-hoon, Jessi
2023	B.I	"Dare To Love" (featuring Big Naughty)	To Die For	Yes	Big Naughty	Yes	Kang Uk-jin, Diggy, Big Naughty
2023	B.I	"Beautiful Life" (featuring Crying Nut)	To Die For	Yes	—	Yes	Sihwang, Kim Chang-hoon, Park Jae-jun, Millennium
2023	B.I	"Cloud Thought"	To Die For	Yes	—	Yes	Basecamp
2023	B.I	"Truth"	To Die For	Yes	—	Yes	Millennium, Sihwang
2023	B.I	"Michelangelo"	To Die For	Yes	—	Yes	Millennium, Sihwang
2023	B.I	"Loved"	Love or Loved Part.2	Yes	Aobeats, Naomi Abergel, Dominic Bucks	Yes	Aobeats, Naomi Abergel, Dominic Bucks
2023	B.I	"4 Letters" (Note: The source doesn't mention any featuring artist.)	Love or Loved Part.2	Yes	Nick Lee, Mason Bennett, Jake Torrey, Jesse Finkelstein	Yes	Nick Lee, Mason Bennett, Jake Torrey, Jesse Finkelstein
2023	B.I	"Alone"	Love or Loved Part.2	Yes	—	Yes	Padi
2023	B.I	"S.O.S"	Love or Loved Part.2	Yes	—	Yes	Stally
2023	B.I	"All Shook Up"	Love or Loved Part.2	Yes	Nick Lee, Jordan Reikind, Dalton Diehl	Yes	Nick Lee, Jordan Reikind, Dalton Diehl
2024	B.I	"Kowai" (ただいま)	Tadaima (ただいま)	Yes	—	Yes	Diggy, Kang Uk-jin
2024	B.I	"Wish You Were Here"	Tadaima (ただいま)	Yes	—	Yes	Padi
2024	B.I	"Sayonara" (さよなら)	Tadaima (ただいま)	Yes	—	Yes	Sihwang
2024	B.I	"Elevator" (featuring Chanmina)	Tadaima (ただいま)	Yes	Chanmina, Vaav	Yes	Padi
2024	B.I	"Nanana" (featuring Sky-Hi)	Tadaima (ただいま)	Yes	Sky-Hi, Vaav	Yes	Millennium
2024	B.I	"Tasty"	Non-album single	Yes	MarcLo, Kaine	Yes	Malibu Babie, Vaughn Oliver, Tobias Wincorn
2025	B.I	"Parade"	Wonderland	Yes	—	Yes	Millennium, Sihwang, Nicolkeem
2025	B.I	"Free Fall"	Wonderland	Yes	—	Yes	Sihwang, Millennium
2025	B.I	"To the Moon"	Wonderland	Yes	—	Yes	Padi
2025	B.I	"Lover Boi"	Wonderland	Yes	—	Yes	Millennium, Jo Eun-oh
2025	B.I	"Gaze" (featuring Gemma Kang)	Wonderland	Yes	—	Yes	Sihwang
2025	B.I	"Ferris Wheel" (featuring Heize)	Wonderland	Yes	—	Yes	Padi, Orange Tree
2025	B.I	"Hug Me"	Wonderland	Yes	—	Yes	Padi, Sihwang, Millennium, Nicolkeem
2025	B.I	"Firefly"	Wonderland	Yes	—	Yes	Nicolkeem
2025	B.I	"Miss Me"	Wonderland	Yes	—	Yes	Nicolkeem
2025	B.I	"Stopwatch"	Wonderland	Yes	—	Yes	Nicolkeem, Numbernine
2025	B.I	"Romance"	Wonderland	Yes	—	Yes	Kang Uk-jin, Diggy

== iKon albums/singles ==
Year	Artist(s)	Song	Album	Lyrics		Music	
Year	Artist(s)	Song	Album	Credited	With	Credited	With
2013	Team B (Pre-debut)	"Climax"	Win Final Battle	Yes	Bobby, Kim Jin-hwan, Koo Jun-hoe	Yes	Lydia Soo Paek, Choice37
2013	Team B (Pre-debut)	"Just Another Boy"	Win Final Battle	Yes	Bobby, Teddy	Yes	Teddy
2014	Team B (Pre-debut)	"Wait For Me"	Mix & Match	Yes	Bobby	Yes	Kang Uk-jin
2015	iKon	"Welcome Back"	Welcome Back	Yes	Bobby	Yes	Rovin
2015	iKon	"Rhythm Ta"	Welcome Back	Yes	Bobby	Yes	P.K, Koo Jun-hoe
2015	iKon	"Rhythm Ta Remix" (Rock ver.)	Welcome Back	Yes	Bobby	Yes	P.K, Koo Jun-hoe
2015	iKon	"My Type"	Welcome Back	Yes	Bobby, Kush	Yes	Choice37, Kush
2015	iKon	"Today"	Welcome Back	Yes	Bobby	Yes	Ham Seung-chun, Kang Uk-jin, Future Bounce
2015	iKon	"Airplane"	Welcome Back	Yes	Bobby	Yes	Future Bounce
2015	iKon	"Dumb & Dumber"	Welcome Back	Yes	Bobby	Yes	Future Bounce
2015	iKon	"What's Wrong?"	Welcome Back	Yes	Bobby	Yes	Rovin
2015	iKon	"I Miss You So Bad"	Welcome Back	Yes	G-Dragon, Bobby	No	—N/a
2015	B.I, Bobby	"Anthem"	Welcome Back	Yes	Bobby	Yes	Teddy, Bobby
2015	iKon	"Apology"	Welcome Back	Yes	Teddy, Kush, Bobby	No	—N/a
2015	iKon	"M.U.P"	Welcome Back	Yes	Bobby	Yes	The Fliptones, The Jackie Boyz
2016	iKon	"#WYD"	Non-album single	Yes	Kush, Bobby	No	—N/a
2017	iKon	"Bling Bling"	New Kids: Begin	Yes	Bobby, Millennium	Yes	Millennium
2017	iKon	"B-Day"	New Kids: Begin	Yes	Bobby	Yes	Airplay, Kang Uk-jin
2017	iKon	"Worldwide"	New Kids: Begin (Japanese edition)	Yes	Bobby, Kush, Sunny Boy, Ta-Trow	Yes	Kush, LDN Noise
2018	iKon	"Love Scenario"	Return	Yes	Bobby, Mot Mal	Yes	Millennium, Seung
2018	iKon	"Beautiful"	Return	Yes	Bobby, Teddy	Yes	Choice37, Teddy
2018	B.I	"One And Only"	Return	Yes	—	Yes	Choice37
2018	iKon	"Jerk"	Return	Yes	Bobby	Yes	Kang Uk-jin
2018	iKon	"Best Friend"	Return	Yes	Lee Jung Hyun	Yes	Future Bounce, Bekuh Boom
2018	iKon	"Everything"	Return	Yes	Bobby, Psy	Yes	Psy, Yoo Gun-hyung
2018	iKon	"Hug Me"	Return	Yes	Bobby	Yes	Tablo
2018	iKon	"Don't Forget"	Return	Yes	Bobby, Kim Joon	Yes	Kang Uk-jin, Diggy
2018	iKon	"Sinosijak"	Return	Yes	Bobby	Yes	Kang Uk-jin
2018	iKon	"Love Me"	Return	Yes	Bobby, Kush	Yes	Choice37, Kush, Koo Jun-hoe
2018	iKon	"Just Go"	Return	Yes	—	Yes	Kang Uk-jin
2018	iKon	"Long Time No See"	Return	Yes	Bobby	Yes	Choice37, Lydia Soo Paek, Taeyang
2018	iKon	"Rubber Band"	The New Kids	Yes	Mino, Seung, Bobby	Yes	Mino, Millennium
2018	iKon	"Killing Me"	New Kids: Continue	Yes	—	Yes	R. Tee, Joe Rhee
2018	iKon	"Freedom"	New Kids: Continue	Yes	Bobby, Seung	Yes	Millennium, Seung
2018	iKon	"Only You"	New Kids: Continue	Yes	Bobby	Yes	Kang Uk-jin
2018	iKon	"Cocktail"	New Kids: Continue	Yes	Bobby	Yes	Millennium
2018	iKon	"Just For You"	New Kids: Continue	Yes	—	Yes	Kang Uk-jin, Godok
2018	iKon	"Goodbye Road"	New Kids: The Final	Yes	Bobby	Yes	Future Bounce, Bekuh Boom
2018	iKon	"Don't Let Me Know"	New Kids: The Final	Yes	Seung	Yes	Millennium
2018	iKon	"Adore You"	New Kids: The Final	Yes	Bobby	Yes	Seo Won-jin
2018	iKon	"Perfect"	New Kids: The Final	Yes	—	Yes	Dee.P
2019	iKon	"I'm OK"	The New Kids	Yes	Bobby, Kim Jong-won	Yes	Future Bounce
2020	iKon	"Dive"	I Decide	Yes	Seung	Yes	Kang Uk-jin, Diggy
2020	iKon	"Ah Yeah"	I Decide	Yes	Bobby	Yes	Millennium
2020	iKon	"All The World"	I Decide	Yes	Dustyy Han, Bobby	Yes	Kang Uk-jin, Diggy
2020	iKon	"Holding On"	I Decide	Yes	—	Yes	Kang Uk-jin, Diggy

== Other artists ==
Year	Artist(s)	Song	Album	Lyrics		Music	
Year	Artist(s)	Song	Album	Credited	With	Credited	With
2014	Winner	"Empty"	2014 S/S	Yes	Mino, Bobby	Yes	P.K
2014	Epik High	"Born Hater" (featuring Beenzino, Verbal Jint, B.I, Mino, Bobby)	Shoebox	Yes	Tablo, Mithra Jin, Beenzino, Verbal Jint, Mino, Bobby	Yes	DJ Tukutz
2016	Blackpink	"Whistle"	Square One	Yes	Teddy, Bekuh BOOM	No	—N/a
2017	Psy	"Bomb" (featuring B.I, Bobby)	4X2=8	Yes	J.Y. Park "The Asiansoul", Psy, Bobby	Yes	J.Y. Park "The Asiansoul", Psy, Yoo Gun-hyung, Bobby
2017	Psy	"Last Scene" (featuring Lee Sung-kyung)	4X2=8	Yes	Psy	No	—N/a
2017	Psy	"Autoreverse" (featuring Tablo)	4X2=8	Yes	Psy, Tablo	No	—N/a
2018	Seungri	"Mollado" (featuring B.I)	The Great Seungri	Yes	Seungri	Yes	Seungri, Future Bounce
2019	Lee Hi	"No One" (featuring B.I)	24°C	Yes	Kim Min-gu, Yoon Myeong-woon	No	—N/a
2019	Lee Hi	"1, 2" (featuring Choi Hyun-suk)	24°C	Yes	Choi Hyun-suk	Yes	Kang Uk-Jin
2019	Eun Ji-won	"Worthless"	G1	Yes	Eun Ji-won	Yes	Millennium
2019	Eun Ji-won	"Sexy"	G1	Yes	Eun Ji-won	Yes	Diggy, Kang Uk-jin
2021	Epik High	"Acceptance Speech" (featuring B.I)	Epik High Is Here (Part 1)	Yes	Tablo, Mithra Jin	Yes	DJ Tukutz
2021	Lee Hi	"Savior" (featuring B.I)	4 Only	Yes	—	Yes	Stally, Basecamp
2022	MC Mong, Soyou	"Don't Wake Me Up"	X by X [Dream]	Yes	MC Mong	Yes	Grvvity, Time
2022	Padi	"Handsome" (featuring B.I, Nucksal, Kid Milli, Gaeko)	Non-album single	Yes	Padi, Nucksal, Kid Milli, Gaeko	Yes	Padi, Dhard
2023	Soovi	"Missing You" (featuring Dvwn)	A Tempo	Yes	Soovi, Dvwn	Yes	Soovi, Sihwang, Padi, Dvwn
2023	Soovi	"Hey"	A Tempo	No	—N/a	Yes	Soovi, Sihwang, Millennium
2023	Padi	"Do" (featuring Lee Hi)	Answer Answer	Yes	Lee Hi	Yes	Padi, Lee Hi, Dhard
2023	Kid Milli	"R.I.P" (featuring B.I)	Beige	Yes	Kid Milli	No	—N/a
2023	Sik-K	"Sorry, I Hate You" (featuring B.I)	Pop a Lot	Yes	Lee Sun-kyu, Kim Yoon-ah, Sik-K	Yes	Lee Sun-kyu, Kim Yoon-ah, Vangdale, Sik-K
2023	Pow	"Favorite"	Favorite	Yes	—	Yes	Basecamp (Johnny and Uk-jin), Stally
2023	Pow	"Dazzling"	Favorite	Yes	Dana	Yes	Padi, Sihwang, Dana
2023	Pow	"Amazing"	Favorite	Yes	—	Yes	Kang Uk-jin, Diggy
2023	James Reid	"Jacuzzi" (with B.I, DJ Flict)	Non-album singles	Yes (Note: The source doesn't specify if the authors contributed by writing lyrics, composing and/or arranging the song.)	DJ Flict, James Reid, Jazelle Rodriguez, Zach Sorgen		
2023	Dynamic Duo	"Smoke (Remix)" (with Zico, B.I, Jay Park, Changmo, Jessi)	Non-album singles	Yes	Gaeko, Choiza, Zico, Jay Park, Changmo, Jessi, John Kim, Ro Jae-kyun	No	—N/a
2023	Big Naughty	"INFJ" (featuring B.I, Bang Ye-dam)	Dingo X Big Naughty	Yes	Big Naughty, Bang Ye-dam	Yes	Way Ched, Big Naughty, Bang Ye-dam
2024	Pow	"Valentine"	Non-album single	Yes	—	Yes	Kang Uk-jin, Diggy
2024	Gist	"Good Memories" (featuring B.I)	Nothing Is Perfect	Yes	Gist	Yes	Sein, Gist
2024	Toil	"I Wish" (featuring Leellamarz, B.I)	Toto	Yes	Leellamarz	Yes	Toil, Leellamarz
2024	Leo	"Pretty Plzzz" (featuring B.I)	Come Closer	Yes	Leo, Nick Vyner, Jordan Reifkind	Yes	Leo, Nick Vyner, Jordan Reifkind, Bangs, Memishi Gentuar, King Wizard, Kuji
2024	Leo	"Farewell"	Come Closer	Yes	—	Yes	Kim Chang-hoon
2024	Kixo	"Love Dilemma" (featuring 10cm, B.I)	Non-album singles	Yes	Kixo	Yes	Kixo, JVN, Yoon Hee-jae
2024	Jo Byeong-kyu	"Don't Cry"	Non-album singles	Yes	—	Yes	Diggy, Kang Uk-jin
2024	Woosung	"Happy Alone" (featuring B.I)	4444	Yes	Woosung, J Angel, Jaramye Daniels, Ristorp	No	—N/a
2024	Pow	"I"	Boyfriend	Yes	—	Yes	Millennium, Kim Chang-hoon, Dana
2024	Pow	"Bae"	Boyfriend	Yes	—	Yes	Millennium, Padi, Dana
2024	Heize	"Fallin'"	Fallin'	Yes	—	Yes	Kang Uk-jin, Time
2025	Reddy	"Reditation" (featuring B.I)	Reddy Made 0.5 Prototype	Yes	Reddy	No	—N/a
2025	Reddy	"Special" (featuring B.I)	Reddy Made 0.5 Prototype	Yes	Reddy	No	—N/a
2025	Huh	"New New" (featuring B.I)	Voice tool tip.txt 2	Yes	Huh	Yes	Huh, Padi
2025	Pow	"Being Tender"	Being Tender	Yes	Yukon, Yorch	Yes	Padi, Stally, Click, Yorch
2025	Pow	"Reason"	Being Tender	Yes	Yorch, Seo-un, Gyu-rin, Pedlar	Yes	Millennium
2025	Jay	"Angel"	207	Yes	—	Yes	Grvvity, Time
2025	Jay	"Loving You"	207	Yes	—	Yes	Saint Leonard
2025	Jeon Somi	"Escapade"	Chaotic & Confused	Yes	Teddy, Jeon Somi	No	—N/a
2025	Jeon Somi	"Chaotic & Confused"	Chaotic & Confused	Yes	Jeon Somi, Teddy, Johan Carlsson, Elvira Anderfjärd, Andrew Luce, Mudd the Student	No	—N/a
2025	BM	"Freak" (featuring B.I)	PO:INT	Yes	BM	Yes	BM
2025	Ash Island	"My Home" (featuring B.I)	Burn Part.1	Yes	Ash Island	Yes	Ash Island, Jo Hyun-jin, Kim Je-hyeok, Noy, Wiss

== Other works ==
Year	Artist(s)	Song	Album	Lyrics		Music	
Year	Artist(s)	Song	Album	Credited	With	Credited	With
2014	Team B	"Mix & Match Title"	—N/a (Note: For Mnet's reality show Mix & Match.)	Yes	Choice37		
2017	B.I, Koo Jun-hoe	"Opening Title"	—N/a (Note: For TV Chosun's series Smashing on Your Back.)	Yes	Seung	Yes	Seung, Rovin
2018	B.I, Bobby, Ahn Jung-hwan, Jasper Cho, Kwon Oh-joong, Kim Yong-man, Cha In-pyo	"Friend"	Non-album promotional single (Note: For MBC's show Curious Husband's Getaway.)	Yes	Bobby, Ahn Jung-hwan, Jasper Cho, Cha In-pyo, Kwon Oh-joong, Kim Yong-man	Yes	Han Jong-seok, Kim Seung-jin
