= IKon Japan Dome Tour =

2017 concert tour by iKON

2017 iKON Japan Dome Tour
- Tour by iKON
- Location: Japan
- Associated album: Welcome Back; New Kids: Begin
- Start date: May 20, 2017
- End date: November 12, 2017
- Legs: 2
- No. of shows: 24

iKON concert chronology
- iKON Japan Tour (2016-17); 2017 iKON Japan Dome Tour (2017); iKon 2018 Continue Tour (2018)

The 2017 iKON Japan Dome Tour was the third tour by iKON in Japan. The tour began on May 20, 2017 in Osaka at Kyocera Dome, and concluded on November 12, 2017 in Kobe. The tour had a total attendance of 323,000, making it iKON's biggest and longest Japanese tour. Despite being marketed as a dome tour, it is not actually a true dome tour, as only two domes were included.

== Development ==
On February 11, 2017, it was announced that iKON will start their first dome tour, with two shows set to be on Kyocera Dome and Seibu Prince Dome, with 90,000 fans expected to come. This mark them as the fastest group to make a concert in Japan dome in just one year and 9 months since debuting in Japan. On June 18, an additional 22 concerts in eight Japanese cities were announced by YGEX, with 233,000 fans are expected to attend their concerts, making it the longest and the largest arena tour held by iKON in Japan.

== Set lists ==
Japan Dome Tour on June 17, 2017 in Saitama
1. "Bling Bling (Korean Ver.)"
2. "Sinosijak (Remix)"
3. "Just Another Boy"
4. "My Type (Acoustic Ver.)"
5. "#WYD"
6. "Today"
7. "Be I" (B.I)
8. "Holup!" (Bobby)
9. "Anthem" (B.I & Bobby)
10. "Just Go"
11. "Apology"
12. "Wait For Me"
13. "Airplane"
14. "Climax"
15. "Rhythm Ta Remix (Rock Ver.)"
16. "B-Day (Korean Ver.)"
17. "Dumb & Dumber"
18. "What's Wrong"
19. "Love Me"
20. "Welcome Back"

Encore

1. "M.U.P"
2. "Bling Bling (Korean Ver.)"
3. "B-Day (Korean Ver.)"
Japan Dome Tour Additional Shows on October 29, 2017 in Chiba.
1. "Bling Bling"
2. "Sinosijak (Remix)"
3. "Just Another Boy"
4. "My Type (Acoustic Ver.)"
5. "#WYD"
6. "Today"
7. "Be I" (B.I)
8. "Holup!" (Bobby)
9. "Anthem" (B.I & Bobby)
10. "Runaway" (Bobby)
11. "Perfect" (Jay, Song, Ju-ne, DK, Chan)
12. "Airplane"
13. "Just Go"
14. "Apology"
15. "Rhythm Ta Remix (Rock Ver.)"
16. "B-Day"
17. "Dumb & Dumber"
18. "What's Wrong"
19. "Worldwide"
20. "Long Time No See"

Encore

1. "Welcome Back"
2. "M.U.P"
3. "Dumb & Dumber"
4. "Bling Bling"

== Tour dates ==
| Date | City | Country | Venue | Attendance |
|---|---|---|---|---|
| May 20, 2017 | Osaka | Japan | Kyocera Dome Osaka | 90,000 |
| June 17, 2017 | Saitama | Japan | Seibu Prince Dome | 90,000 |
| September 9, 2017 | Kobe | Japan | World Memorial Hall | 233,000 |
| September 10, 2017; Two shows | Kobe | Japan | World Memorial Hall | 233,000 |
| September 16, 2017; Two shows | Nagano | Japan | Big Hat | 233,000 |
| October 1, 2017; Two shows | Fukuoka | Japan | Marine Messe Fukuoka | 233,000 |
| October 4, 2017; Two shows | Yokohama | Japan | Yokohama Arena | 233,000 |
| October 7, 2017; Two shows | Hiroshima | Japan | Hiroshima Prefectural Sports Center | 233,000 |
| October 8, 2017 | Hiroshima | Japan | Hiroshima Prefectural Sports Center | 233,000 |
| October 14, 2017; Two shows | Fukuroi | Japan | Ecopa Arena | 233,000 |
| October 17, 2017; Two shows | Nagoya | Japan | Nippon Gaishi Hall | 233,000 |
| October 28, 2017; Two shows | Chiba | Japan | Makuhari Messe | 233,000 |
| October 29, 2017 | Chiba | Japan | Makuhari Messe | 233,000 |
| November 11, 2017; Two shows | Kobe | Japan | World Memorial Hall | 233,000 |
| November 12, 2017 | Kobe | Japan | World Memorial Hall | 233,000 |
| Total | | | | 323,000 |

== DVD and Blu-ray ==
=== iKON Japan Dome Tour 2017 ===
iKON Japan Dome Tour 2017

Video by iKON
- Released: September 27, 2017
- Recorded: May 20, 2017
- Language: Japanese
- Label: YGEX

iKON Japan Dome Tour 2017 is a live DVD & Blu-ray by the group, released on September 27 in Japan. The DVD/Blu-ray was filmed during the group first ever concert on Japanese Dome Kyocera Dome.

The DVD/Blu-ray came in 4 versions, includes a total of the 22 songs that were sung live, including a documentary the show, focus dance of 4 songs, a collection of the group best stages from their second show at Seibu Prince Dome and a special features section.

==== Track listing ====
Deluxe Edition
| No. | Title | Length |
|---|---|---|
| 1. | "Bling Bling" |
| 2. | "Sinosijak (Remix)" |
| 3. | "Just Another Boy + -MC-" |
| 4. | "My Type" |
| 5. | "#WYD" |
| 6. | "Today + -MC-" |
| 7. | "BE I" |
| 8. | "HOLUP!" |
| 9. | "Anthem + -Dance Performance- + -Movie-" |
| 10. | "Just Go" |
| 11. | "Apology" |
| 12. | "Wait For Me + -MC-" |
| 13. | "Airplane" |
| 14. | "Climax + -Movie-" |
| 15. | "Rhythm Ta Remix (Rock Ver.)" |
| 16. | "B-Day" |
| 17. | "Dumb & Dumber" |
| 18. | "What's Wrong" |
| 19. | "Love Me" |
| 20. | "Welcome Back" |
| 21. | "M.U.P" |
| 22. | "Long Time No See + -MC-" |
| 23. | "Rhythm Ta Remix (Rock Ver.)" |
| 24. | "Documentary of iKon Japan Dome Tour 2017" |
| 25. | "Focus on Dance" |
| 26. | "Collection of Best Stage (2017/6/17 MetLife Dome)" |
| 27. | "Special Features (2017/6/17 MetLife Dome)" |
| 28. | "Love Me MV" |
| 29. | "Special Movie" |

==== Charts ====
Upon it release the DVD/Blu-ray topped Oricon Daily Chart. In the first week it debuted at number one on the Oricon DVD Chart, making it iKON second number one on the chart, the Blu-ray edition also debuted at number 6, both sold 9,900 copies in the first week.

| Chart (2014) | Peak position |
|---|---|
| Oricon Music DVD Chart | 1 |
| Oricon Music Blu-ray Chart | 6 |

==== Sales ====
| Chart | Sales |
|---|---|
| Japan (Oricon) | 9,900 |
