= Return (iKon album) =

- Digital and Red version cover

Studio album by iKon
- Released: January 25, 2018
- Studio: YG (Seoul)
- Genres: K-pop; hip hop; dance-pop
- Length: 42:51
- Language: Korean
- Label: YG
- Producer: B.I

IKon chronology
New Kids: Begin (2017)	Return (2018)	New Kids: Continue (2018)

Singles from Return
- 1. "Love Scenario" Released: January 25, 2018

Return (also known as New Kids: Return) is the second studio album by South Korean male group iKon. It was released on January 25, 2018, and is the second of the group's four-part album series, The New Kids. iKon's leader B.I was credited as the only record producer of the album. The album contains 12 songs including the hit lead single "Love Scenario", all written or co-written by B.I.

== Background ==
After releasing their debut album Welcome Back in 2015, the group went on several tours for two years, embarking on their first Asia tour and two Japanese tours, including Japan Dome tour, the group sold over 800,000 tickets from these tours, breaking several records for a rookie artist, including being the fastest group to host a concert in a Japan dome since debut. During touring the group released two singles, "WYD?" and "New Kids: Begin".

In September 2017, iKON had confirmed to have filmed new music videos, Yang Hyun Suk shared a video of the group shooting a music video on his personal social media account on September 20. The following month the members stated that they were working on music and would release it soon. In December, YG Entertainment announced that the group would make their comeback in January 2018, Yang shared another teaser of music video filming through his social media. On January 6, iKON released a comeback teaser film, where the title of the album Return was revealed. The film was directed by VM Project Architecture, and included monologue from member Bobby. iKON stated they chose the album name because it conveys the feeling of looking back at their starting point and initial intentions. On January 12, YG Entertainment revealed the first poster with the official release date through their official blog. The following day they announced the lead single "Love Scenario". The tracklist was later revealed, with eight new tracks and four Korean versions of songs previously released in Japan. B.I was credited as the lead writer and producer for all 12 songs, with other YG artists and producers who worked on the album, including Psy, Tablo, Choice37, Teddy Park, Bekuh BOOM, Millennium, Yoo Gun-hyung, and others.

== Release and promotion ==
The album was made available for pre-order on January 18. The album was released digitally on January 25, while the physical release occurred on January 26. The album has two different versions, Red and Black, with a 120-page photo book, 8 postcards, photo cards, selfie cards, and photo films, while limited quantities produced in initial production included a poster.

iKON held a live broadcast via Naver V Live, 19 hours prior to their new album release, with the number of viewers surpassing 200,000. The group were also guests on JTBC’s Knowing Bros and MBC Every 1’s Weekly Idol to promote the album. iKON performed "Love Scenario" for the first time on MBC TV's Show! Music Core on January 27. The group held a series of fan signing events in South Korea to promote the album. They also announced their first fan-meeting event in South Korea, under YG's Private Stage, a new fan-meeting brand that aims for high-quality performances based on communication between artists and fans. The fan meeting was held on March 11 at Olympic Hall.

The group recorded their first reality show titled "iKON TV" which showcases behind-the-scenes stories of the members.

== Critical reception ==
Professional ratings
Review scores
Source	Rating
IZM	3/5 stars
The Star	7/10 stars

Billboard praised the title song "Love Scenario", saying "“Love Scenario” is guided by a gentle cowbell-style beat and swaying vocals. The song relays a mellow, yet relatively upbeat, reaction to breaking up, with a circuitous melody that guides the rhythmic dance track. It's more emotional than their boisterous most-recent singles, and serves as a subtle directional change and maturing for iKON." "Love Scenario" was also chosen as Apple Music's Best of the Week.

Chester Chin from The Star praised the diverse of the album, saying "new musical direction adds another dimension to iKON’s artistry", and notice how the band music direction changed from "loud and aggressive sound" to more "toned down pop pieces with some hip-hop and soft rock stylings."

== Commercial performance ==
In South Korea, Return debuted at 2 on the Gaon Album Chart. In Japan, with two days in sales, the Korean version of the album debuted at 4 on Oricon's weekly digital chart, selling 1,500. The following week it charted at 20 and sold 510 copies. The album debuted at 12 on the physical weekly chart, selling 5,442. On Billboard Japan, the album charted at 5 on top download albums, and 23 on hot albums. In the United States, the album charted at 4 on Billboard World Albums and 12 on Top Heatseekers albums.

Upon its release, "Love Scenario" topped China's QQ Music's real-time chart. It also entered the top 10 on QQ Music's weekly chart. In South Korea, the song debuted at 12 on the Gaon Weekly Chart. It has topped the chart for six weeks, the first artist to achieve this milestone.

== Awards and nominations ==
=== MBC Plus X Genie Music Awards ===
Year	Nominee / work	Award	Result
2018	Return	Digital Album of the Year	Nominated

=== Melon Music Awards ===
Year	Nominee / work	Award	Result
2018	Return	Album of the Year	Nominated

== Track listing ==
No.	Title	Lyrics	Music	Arrangement	Length
1.	"Love Scenario" (사랑을 했다; Sarang-eul haetda)	B.I; Bobby; Mot Mal	B.I; Millennium; Seung	Millennium	3:29
2.	"Beautiful"	B.I; Bobby; Teddy	Choice37; B.I; Teddy	Choice37; Teddy	3:15
3.	"One and Only" (B.I solo; 돗대; Dotdae)	B.I	Choice37; B.I	Choice37	3:26
4.	"Jerk" (나쁜놈; nappeunnom)	B.I; Bobby	B.I; Kang Uk-Jin	Kang Uk-Jin	3:43
5.	"Best Friend"	B.I; Lee Jung Hyun	Future Bounce; Bekuh BOOM; B.I	Future Bounce	3:50
6.	"Everything"	B.I; Bobby; Psy	Psy; Yoo Gun-hyung; B.I	Psy; Yoo Gun-hyung	3:34
7.	"Hug Me" (안아보자; an-aboja)	B.I; Bobby	B.I; Tablo	Tablo	3:36
8.	"Don't Forget" (잊지마요; ij-jimayo)	B.I; Bobby; Kim Joon	B.I; Kang Uk-jin; Diggy	Kang Uk-jin; Diggy	4:13

Special bonus tracks
No.	Title	Lyrics	Music	Arrangement	Length
9.	"Sinosijak" (시노시작; sino sijag)	B.I; Bobby	B.I; Kang Uk-jin	Kang Uk-jin	3:08
10.	"Love Me" (나를 사랑하지 않나요?; nareul saranghaji anhnayo?)	B.I; Bobby; Kush; Ju-ne	Choice37; B.I; Kush; Ju-ne	Choice37	3:28
11.	"Just Go"	B.I	Kang Uk-jin; B.I	Kang Uk-jin	3:36
12.	"Long Time No See"	B.I; Bobby	B.I; Choice37; Lydia; Taeyang	Choice37	3:26
Total length:					42:51

== Charts ==
=== Weekly charts ===
Chart (2018)	Peak position
French Download Albums (SNEP)	117
Japan Digital Albums (Oricon)	4
Japan Weekly Albums (Oricon)	12
Japan Download Albums (Billboard Japan)	5
Japan Hot Albums (Billboard Japan)	23
South Korean Albums (Gaon)	2
US Top Heatseekers (Billboard)	9
US World Albums (Billboard)	4

=== Year-end charts ===
Chart (2018)	Position
South Korean Albums (Gaon)	45

== Release history ==
Country	Date	Label(s)	Format	Ref.
Various	January 25, 2018	YG	Digital download	
South Korea	January 26, 2018	YG	CD	
Japan	January 27, 2018	YGEX	Digital download	
Japan	March 14, 2018	YGEX	CD, DVD	
