= IKoncert 2016: Showtime Tour =

2016 concert tour by iKon

iKoncert 2016: Showtime Tour
- Tour by iKon
- iKoncert 2016: Showtime Tour Official Poster
- Associated album: Welcome Back
- Start date: January 30, 2016
- End date: September 3, 2016
- No. of shows: 14 in Japan; 4 in South Korea; 5 in China; 1 in Taiwan; 1 in Thailand; 1 in Singapore; 1 in Malaysia; 1 in Indonesia; 28 in total

iKon concert chronology
- iKoncert 2016: Showtime Tour (2016); iKON Japan Tour (2016–17)

iKoncert 2016: Showtime Tour (stylized as iKONCERT 2016: Showtime Tour) was the first Asian tour by South Korean boy band iKon, in support of their debut studio album Welcome Back. The tour visited South Korea, Japan, China, Hong Kong, Taiwan, Thailand, Singapore, Malaysia and Indonesia. The tour began on January 30, 2016 in Seoul at Olympic Gymnastics Arena and ended on September 3, 2016 in Jakarta, Indonesia.

== Background ==
Following iKon's Japanese debut on January 13, 2016, the band embarked on their first Japanese arena tour "iKoncert: Showtime Tour in Japan 2016". Announced on October 5, 2015, the tour was originally set to visit 3 cities for an audience of 95,000. After adding 2 more cities, the tour gathered a total of 146,000 congert-goers from 14 shows: 8,000 from two shows in Fukuoka, 13,000 from Tokyo and 24,000 from Osaka.

On March 17, YG Entertainment announced 2 cities to commence iKon's Showtime Tour in Asia. The cities were Taiwan and Hong Kong. Afterwards, Chengdu, Nanjing, Shenzhen and Shanghai in China were included as well. The tour eventually expanded to include Thailand, Singapore, Malaysia and Indonesia.

== Special guests ==
- Akdong Musician
- Lee Hi

== Set list ==
This set list is representative of the show on January 31, 2017 in Seoul. It is not representative of all concerts for the duration of the tour.

1. "Rhythm Ta Remix (Rock Version)"
2. "Dumb & Dumber"
3. "Sinosijak"
4. "Be I" (B.I Solo)
5. "Go" (Bobby Solo)
6. "Anthem"
7. "Apology"
8. "Wait For Me"
9. "Airplane"
10. "Bang Bang Bang" (cover BigBang)
11. "Me Gustas Tu" (Jinhwan) (cover GFriend)
12. "Up & Down" (cover EXID)
13. "I'm Different" (feat. Bobby) (Hi Suhyun)
14. "M.U.P"
15. "I Miss You So Bad"
16. "My Type"
17. "Today"
18. "What's Wrong?"
19. "Just Another Boy"
20. "Climax"

Encore

1. "Long Time No See"
2. "Welcome Back"
3. "My Type"
4. "Dumb & Dumber"

== Concerts Dates ==
Date	City	Country	Venue	Attendance
January 30, 2016	Seoul	South Korea	Olympic Gymnastics Arena	24,000
January 31, 2016	Seoul	South Korea	Olympic Gymnastics Arena	24,000
February 11, 2016	Fukuoka	Japan	Fukuoka Convention Center	146,000
February 11, 2016	Fukuoka	Japan	Fukuoka Convention Center	146,000
February 15, 2016	Tokyo	Japan	Nippon Budokan	146,000
February 16, 2016	Tokyo	Japan	Nippon Budokan	146,000
February 16, 2016	Tokyo	Japan	Nippon Budokan	146,000
February 20, 2016	Kobe	Japan	World Memorial Hall	146,000
February 20, 2016	Kobe	Japan	World Memorial Hall	146,000
February 21, 2016	Kobe	Japan	World Memorial Hall	146,000
February 21, 2016	Kobe	Japan	World Memorial Hall	146,000
February 27, 2016	Daegu	South Korea	Daegu EXCO	—N/a
March 5, 2016	Busan	South Korea	Busan BEXCO	—N/a
March 12, 2016	Chiba	Japan	Makuhari Messe	(Note: The score data is combined from the shows held at the Fukuoka Convention Center, Nippon Budokan, World Memorial Hall, Makuhari Messe and Osaka-jō Hall from 11, 15, 16, 20, 21 February & 12, 13, 15 March 2016 respectively.)
March 12, 2016	Chiba	Japan	Makuhari Messe	(Note: The score data is combined from the shows held at the Fukuoka Convention Center, Nippon Budokan, World Memorial Hall, Makuhari Messe and Osaka-jō Hall from 11, 15, 16, 20, 21 February & 12, 13, 15 March 2016 respectively.)
March 13, 2016	Chiba	Japan	Makuhari Messe	(Note: The score data is combined from the shows held at the Fukuoka Convention Center, Nippon Budokan, World Memorial Hall, Makuhari Messe and Osaka-jō Hall from 11, 15, 16, 20, 21 February & 12, 13, 15 March 2016 respectively.)
March 15, 2016	Osaka	Japan	Osaka-jō Hall	(Note: The score data is combined from the shows held at the Fukuoka Convention Center, Nippon Budokan, World Memorial Hall, Makuhari Messe and Osaka-jō Hall from 11, 15, 16, 20, 21 February & 12, 13, 15 March 2016 respectively.)
March 15, 2016	Osaka	Japan	Osaka-jō Hall	(Note: The score data is combined from the shows held at the Fukuoka Convention Center, Nippon Budokan, World Memorial Hall, Makuhari Messe and Osaka-jō Hall from 11, 15, 16, 20, 21 February & 12, 13, 15 March 2016 respectively.)
April 22, 2016	Taipei	Taiwan	Taipei Arena	7,000
May 7, 2016	Hong Kong	China	AsiaWorld–Arena	—N/a
May 14, 2016	Chengdu	China	Sichuan Provincial Gymnasium	—N/a
May 21, 2016	Nanjing	China	Nanjing Olympic Sports Center Gymnasium	—N/a
June 3, 2016	Shenzhen	China	Shenzhen Bay Sports Center	—N/a
June 11, 2016	Shanghai	China	Shanghai Indoor Stadium	—N/a
July 16, 2016	Bangkok	Thailand	IMPACT Exhibition Center	—N/a
July 24, 2016	Singapore		Singapore Indoor Stadium	6,500
August 13, 2016	Kuala Lumpur	Malaysia	Stadium Negara	7,000
September 3, 2016	Jakarta	Indonesia	Indonesia Convention Exhibition (ICE) Hall	5,000
Total				N/A
