= No Mercy (TV series) =

2025 South Korean television series

- Promotional poster
- Hangul: 단죄
- Hanja: 斷罪
- Lit.: Condemnation
- RR: Danjoe
- MR: Tanjoe
- Genre: Revenge; Crime thriller
- Written by: Kim Dan-bi
- Directed by: Choi Hyung-joon
- Starring: Lee Joo-young; Ji Seung-hyun; Koo Jun-hoe
- Country of origin: South Korea
- Original language: Korean
- No. of episodes: 8

Production
- Running time: 43–51 minutes
- Production companies: Tiger Studio; EDS Channel

Original release
- Network: Wavve; Dramax
- Release: September 24 – October 16, 2025

No Mercy (Korean: 단죄) is a 2025 South Korean revenge crime thriller television series written by Kim Dan-bi, directed by Choi Hyung-joon, and starring Lee Joo-young, Ji Seung-hyun, and Koo Jun-hoe. The series follows an unknown actress who loses her parents to a voice-phishing scam and infiltrates the criminal organization using deep fake technology to take revenge. It was released on Wavve and Dramax from September 24, to October 16, 2025.

== Synopsis ==
Ha So-min, a former police university student turned struggling actress, seeks revenge after her parents are destroyed by a voice-phishing organization called Ilseongpa. Using her acting skills and knowledge of technology, she infiltrates the criminal group, assuming multiple identities to uncover their operations. Along the way, she forms a tense alliance with Park Jeong-hun, a detective pursuing the same criminals, navigating a dangerous world of deception, espionage, and high-stakes fraud.

== Cast and characters ==
=== Main ===
- Lee Joo-young as Ha So-min

A former police academy student turned struggling actress.

- Ji Seung-hyun as Ma Seok-gu

The leader of the loan-fraud phishing organization Ilseongpa.

- Koo Jun-hoe as Park Jeong-hun

A detective who graduated at the top of his police academy class.

=== Supporting ===
- Shin Su-ho as Kim Do-jin

A former member of Ilseongpa and now an informant for Jeong-hun.

- Lee Ji-ha as Mi-yang

So-min's mother.

- Cha Hyun-seung as Yoo-seung

Seok-gu's close aide and personal secretary.

- Lee Eun-joo as a flower shop owner
- Seo Jin-won as Ha Hyun-jin

So-min's father.

- Nam Gwon-a as In Ye-hyang

== Production and release ==
In December 2024, Lee Joo-young has been cast as the lead in the eight-episode Wavve original drama and began filming in mid-February 2025. The series is written by Kim Dan-bi, directed by Hwang In-hyuk, and produced by Tiger Studio and EDS Channel. It was scheduled to be released on Wavve in May 2025. In addition, the drama was selected by the Korea Creative Content Agency in 2024 for production support as OTT-specialized content.

In February 2025, Wavve announced that the series was part of their content lineup that would be released in the first half of 2025, changed the director to Choi Hyung-joon, and cast Ji Seung-hyun and Koo Jun-hoe as the other lead actors.

In August 2025, the series was confirmed to be released on Wavve on September 24, every Wednesday and Thursday at 21:30 (KST) and simultaneously broadcast on Dramax at 21:40 (KST).
