= Love Scenario =

2018 single by iKon

- Japanese version digital cover

Single by iKon

from the album Return
- Language: Korean; Mandarin; Japanese
- Released: January 25, 2018
- Studio: YG (Seoul)
- Genre: K-pop; hip hop
- Length: 3:29
- Label: YG; YGEX
- Composers: B.I; Millenium; Seung
- Lyricists: B.I; Bobby; Mot Mal
- Producer: B.I

IKon singles chronology
"New Kids: Begin" (2017)	"Love Scenario" (2018)	"Rubber Band" (2018)

Music video
- "Love Scenario" on YouTube

"Love Scenario" (Korean: 사랑을 했다; RR: Sarang-eul haetda) is a song recorded by South Korean boy group iKon. It was released as the lead single of their second studio album, Return. The song won "Song of the Year" at the 2018 Melon Music Awards and 33rd Golden Disc Awards. It is recognized as iKon's signature song.

== Background and composition ==
"Love Scenario" is described as a mellow, yet relatively upbeat, with a circuitous melody that guides the rhythmic dance track.

"I wanted to express what I found regrettable, neither sad nor happy, in the warm farewell which inspired me by the last 10 minutes of the film La La Land," group leader and songwriter B.I stated. He continued, "The main protagonist smiles at his past lover in the end, and I felt, 'That's enough.'"

== Chart performance ==
Upon its release, "Love Scenario" topped China's QQ Music's real-time chart. It also entered the top 10 on QQ Music's weekly chart. In South Korea, the song debuted at 12 on the Gaon Weekly Chart. It topped the chart for six weeks straight, becoming the longest-running number-one song in Gaon history. On February 5, it reached number one on numerous digital platforms such as iChart, Melon, Genie, Bugs, Mnet, Naver, and Soribada, and also number one on the weekly overall chart, Instiz's iChart. They are the second boy band to ever have achieved number one on more than seven music charts since iChart began ranking songs in 2010, with Big Bang having previously accomplishing a similar feat. The group managed to achieve 204 hourly Perfect All Kills, where a song is number one on all charts for a certain amount of time. The song spent 913 hours at number one on the Melon Chart and 40 days at number one on the Melon daily chart.

The group was named top artists of the first half of 2018 by Genie Music, as they topped their daily chart for 35 days.

"Love Scenario" became the first song to receive a Gaon platinum certification from the Korea Music Content Industry Association in the streaming category after surpassing 100 million streams.

== Critical reception ==
Billboard praised the song, saying it "is guided by a gentle cowbell-style beat and swaying vocals. The song relays a mellow, yet relatively upbeat, reaction to breaking up, with a circuitous melody that guides the rhythmic dance track. It's more emotional than their boisterous most-recent singles, and serves as a subtle directional change and maturing for iKON." "Love Scenario" was also chosen as Apple Music's Best of the Week.

Year-end lists
Critic/Publication	List	Rank	Ref.
Billboard	The 20 Best K-pop Songs of 2018: Critics' Picks	7	
BuzzFeed	30 Songs That Helped Define K-Pop In 2018	10	
The Dong-a Ilbo	Best Songs of 2018	1	
HK01	20 Must Listen to K-Pop Songs of 2018	2	
Paper	PAPER's Top 20 K-Pop Songs of 2018	4	
Sanook	10 Popular Songs From 2018	—N/a	
SBS PopAsia	Top 100 Asian pop songs of 2018	3	
YouTube Rewind	Top 10 Most Popular Music Videos In Korea From 2018	1	

== Impact ==
The song achieved substantial popularity, especially from kindergarteners and elementary schoolers due to its easy-to-follow melodies and lyrics. Some elementary schools banned students from singing "Love Scenario" in classrooms because of its inappropriate content and students showing signs of addiction to catchy tunes. It was featured in several popular Korean TV shows, including Running Man, Infinite Challenge, and the third season of Squid Game.

In March 2019, the song was made into an exclusive in-game emote in Fortnite, which players could get by purchasing any Galaxy S10 series smartphone through a partnership between Epic Games and Samsung Mobile. The emote was available until the end of that year.

== Music video ==
The "Love Scenario" music video was shot with a motion control camera. The background displays nostalgic scenery and props; each scene consists of naturally connected shots, and the Korean media said that this production method adds "fun" to the film. The music video also shows the synchronized dance of seven members, with love stories shown in the background to reflect the lyrics. Among them, the film presents a period from top to bottom, showing iKon's star-shaped dance, which was called the highlight of the music video by Billboard.

On May 24, 2021, the music video reached 500 million views on YouTube.

== Chinese and Japanese version ==
On 12 July, the Chinese version of the hit song was released, with the lyrics being written by Tiger Hu. While in 2019, the Japanese version was released on 27 February.

== Charts ==
=== Weekly charts ===
Chart (2018)	Peak position
China (QQ Music Single Chart)	10
South Korea (Gaon)	1
US World Digital Songs (Billboard)	4

=== Year-end charts ===
Chart (2018)	Position
South Korea (Gaon)	1

== Accolades ==
Awards and nominations for "Love Scenario"
Year	Organization	Category	Result	Ref.
2018	Melon Music Awards	Best Rap/Hip-hop	Nominated	
2018	Melon Music Awards	Song of The Year (Daesang)	Won	
2018	MBC Plus X Genie Music Awards	Rap/Hip Hop Music Award	Won	
2018	MBC Plus X Genie Music Awards	Best Song of The Year	Nominated	
2018	Mnet Asian Music Awards	Song of The Year (Daesang)	Nominated	
2018	Mnet Asian Music Awards	Best Vocal Performance Group	Won	
2019	Golden Disc Awards	Digital Song Division (Bonsang)	Won	
2019	Golden Disc Awards	Digital Song of The Year (Daesang)	Won	
2019	Seoul Music Awards	Record of the Year in Digital Release	Won	
2019	Gaon Chart Music Awards	Song of the Year – January	Won	
2019	Gaon Chart Music Awards	Long-Run Song of the Year	Won	
2019	The Fact Music Awards	Best Song	Won	

Music program awards
Program	Date (11 total)	Ref.
M Countdown (Mnet)	February 1, 2018	
M Countdown (Mnet)	March 1, 2018	
M Countdown (Mnet)	March 8, 2018	
Inkigayo (SBS)	February 18, 2018	
Inkigayo (SBS)	February 25, 2018	
Inkigayo (SBS)	March 4, 2018	
Show! Music Core (MBC)	February 24, 2018	
Show! Music Core (MBC)	March 3, 2018	
Show! Music Core (MBC)	March 10, 2018	
Music Bank (KBS)	March 2, 2018	
Show Champion (MBC Music)	March 7, 2018	

Melon Popularity Award
Award	Date	Ref.
Weekly Popularity Award	February 5, 2018	
Weekly Popularity Award	February 12, 2018	
Weekly Popularity Award	February 19, 2018	
Weekly Popularity Award	February 26, 2018	
Weekly Popularity Award	March 5, 2018	

== Certifications ==
Certifications for "Love Scenario"
Region	Certification	Certified units/sales
South Korea (KMCA)	Platinum	2,500,000^{*}
Streaming
Japan (RIAJ)	Gold	50,000,000^{†}
South Korea (KMCA)	2× Platinum	200,000,000^{†}
^{*} Sales figures based on certification alone.^{†} Streaming-only figures based on certification alone.

== See also ==
- List of M Countdown Chart winners (2018)
