= Take Off (iKon album) =

- Digital cover

Studio album by iKon
- Released: May 4, 2023
- Length: 33:24
- Language: Korean
- Label: 143

IKon chronology
Flashback (2022)	Take Off (2023)

Singles from Take Off
- 1. "Tantara" Released: April 25, 2023; 2. "U" Released: May 4, 2023

"Tantara" cover

Take Off is the third studio album by South Korean boy band iKon. It was released on May 4, 2023, by 143 Entertainment, the first release following the expiration of their exclusive contract with YG Entertainment in December 2022.

The album comprises ten tracks, among which "U" serves as the lead single, while "Tantara" was pre-released on April 25, 2023. Nine out of the ten songs were either written or co-written, and co-composed by members Bobby, DK, and Ju-ne. The last three tracks of the album are solo songs by Song, DK, and Ju-ne, respectively.

== Release and promotion ==
After signing with 143 Entertainment on January 1, 2023, iKon announced their intention to release a new album in April. Then in early March, iKon announced their Take Off World Tour across Asia, Europe, and North America. On April 4, iKon's label teased their upcoming album, and on April 17, the group officially announced that their third studio album, named Take Off, would be released on May 4, 2023.

On April 25, 2023, the first single from the album, "Tantara", and a dance performance video was released. The performance was choreographed by Aiki and the dance team Hook, who also appeared in the video. On May 3, iKon appeared on the variety show Weekly Idol for the first time in five years, and performed "Tantara", as well as some of their previous songs. On the same day, they uploaded the music video teaser for their lead single "U".

Take Off was released to digital music and streaming platforms on May 4, 2023, accompanied by a bright and upbeat music video for "U". iKon appeared on Mnet's M Countdown on the same day as the album's release. The album's CD's were available for pre-order in two versions: U and Tantara, and were officially released on May 13.

iKon kicked off their 2023 Take Off World Tour with a two-day concert in Seoul on May 5–6.

== Track listing ==
Take Off track listing
No.	Title	Lyrics	Music	Arrangement	Length
1.	"U"	Bobby	Bobby; The Proof	The Proof	3:19
2.	"Tantara" (딴따라^{[a]})	DK; Bobby; MinorMilo	DK; MinorMilo; Bobby	MinorMilo; DK	2:47
3.	"Rum Pum Pum"	Bobby	Bobby; DK; The Proof; Millennium	Millennium; The Proof	2:53
4.	"Like a Movie" (영화처럼^{[b]})	Ju-ne; Bobby	Ju-ne; Kang Uk-jin	Kang Uk-jin	3:26
5.	"Driving Slowly"	Bobby	Bobby; The Proof	The Proof	3:03
6.	"Never Forget You" (잊어볼게^{[c]})	DK; Bobby	DK; Kang Uk-jin; Diggy	Kang Uk-jin; Diggy	4:04
7.	"All the Way Here" (여기까진가봐^{[d]})	DK; Bobby	DK; Kang Uk-jin; Diggy	Kang Uk-jin; Diggy	3:58
8.	"Fighting" (으라차차;^{[e]} Song solo)	LP; Sonny; Lil G; Hae	LP; Sonny; Lil G	LP	3:30
9.	"Kiss Me" (DK solo)	DK	DK; Kang Uk-jin; Diggy; glowingdog	DK; Diggy; glowingdog; Where The Noise; Xerry	3:13
10.	"Want You Back" (Ju-ne solo)	Ju-ne	Ju-ne; Choice37; Hae	Hae; Choice37	3:07
Total length:					33:24

Notes

- ^a "딴따라" (ttanttara) is an old-fashioned Korean slang term that is used in a derogatory way to mock or criticize celebrities and individuals who are seen as lacking cultural sophistication or having poor taste.
- ^b "영화처럼" (yeonghwacheoreom) is a Korean expression that means "like in a movie", often used to describe a situation or experience that feels like it is straight out of a movie.
- ^c "잊어볼게" (ijeobolge) is a Korean phrase that means "I'll try to forget" or "I'll try to put it behind me". It is often used when one wants to move on from a past experience or memory and suggests a willingness to let go and move forward.
- ^d "여기까진가봐" (yeogikkajingabwa) is a Korean expression that roughly translates to "I guess this is as far as it goes" or "I think we've reached the end of the line."
- ^e "으라차차" (eurachacha) is a Korean expression that is often used to cheer someone on or to encourage them to do their best. It can be translated to something like "Go, go!" or "Fight, fight!" and is similar in meaning to the English expressions "Hooray!" or "Let's go!"

== Charts ==
=== Weekly charts ===
Weekly chart performance for Take Off
Chart (2023)	Peak position
Japanese Digital Albums (Oricon)	15
Japanese Hot Albums (Billboard Japan)	49
South Korean Albums (Circle)	4

=== Monthly charts ===
Monthly chart performance for Take Off
Chart (2023)	Position
South Korean Albums (Circle)	11

== Release history ==
Release dates and formats for Take Off
Region	Date	Format(s)	Label
Various	May 4, 2023	Digital download; streaming	143 Entertainment
South Korea	May 11, 2023	CD	143 Entertainment
