= Flashback (EP) =

Flashback 4th EP by South Korean Boy group iKon

- Digital and Red version cover

EP by iKON
- Released: May 3, 2022
- Genre: Synthwave; pop; hip hop; soul
- Length: 16:47 (digital); 20:15 (physical)
- Language: Korean
- Label: YG

IKON chronology
I Decide (2020)	Flashback (2022)	Take Off (2023)

Singles from Flashback
- 1. "At Ease" Released: May 28, 2021; 2. "But You" Released: May 3, 2022

Flashback is the fourth EP by South Korean boy band iKon. It was released by YG Entertainment on May 3, 2022. The EP consists of six tracks, including the single "At Ease", which was previously performed by iKon on Kingdom: Legendary War, and the lead single "But You".

This is the last EP release of iKon under YG Entertainment, prior to their departure to 143 Entertainment at the end of the year.

== Background and release ==
On April 11, 2022, YG Entertainment announced iKon's upcoming comeback with a coming soon poster posted on various YG Entertainment's Social Media accounts. On April 14, 2022, a concept teaser was released via iKon's official YouTube channel and other social media accounts. The title of the EP was announced to be Flashback on April 17, 2022. The title of the lead single from the EP was announced to be "But You" on April 22, 2022. On April 24, 2022, the EP was announced to consist of six tracks in total, with the sixth track being the previously released single "At Ease". On April 26, 2022, the first teaser of the music video for "But you" was released. The album sampler was released on April 30, 2022.

The first five tracks of the EP were released to digital music and streaming platforms on May 3, 2022. The accompanying music video for the title track, "But You", was released at the same time on iKon's official YouTube channel. The sixth track "At Ease", which was previously performed by iKon on Kingdom: Legendary War, was exclusively made available on CD only. But the song was previously released digitally on all streaming platforms on May 28, 2021. The album's CDs were made available for pre-order prior to the album release, and were released on May 10, 2022. Nine different versions of the CDs were available: Photobook (Red and Green), Digipack (one for each member) and Kit.

== Songwriting and composition ==
Among the six songs included in the album, iKon's member Kim Dong-hyuk, professionally known as DK, co-wrote lyrics for two of the songs and co-composed three of the songs. iKon's member Bobby wrote lyrics for and co-composed one of the six tracks, and co-wrote lyrics for all the other tracks. And iKon's member Kim Jin-hwan, professionally known as Jay, co-composed one of the six tracks. iKon's label mates from YG, Mino and Yoon, members of the South Korean boy band Winner, co-wrote and co-composed one song each.

== Commercial performance ==
Flashback debuted at number 2 on the Gaon Album Chart in South Korea, selling 99,918 copies. In Japan, the EP peaked at number 10 on the Oricon Albums Chart. It also topped the iTunes chart in 18 regions. Flashback holds the record for highest iKon first day and first week album sales with first day sales of 44,359 copies and first week sales of 73,362 copies.

== Track listing ==
Credits adapted from YG Entertainment's tracklist poster.

Flashback track listing
No.	Title	Lyrics	Music	Arrangement	Length
1.	"But You" (너라는 이유 "Neoraneun Iyu" [lit. "The Reason is You"])	Airplay; Kid Wine; Bobby; Maribelle Anes	Kang Uk-jin; Diggy; Maribelle Anes	Kang Uk-jin; Diggy	3:32
2.	"Dragon" (용 "Yong" [lit. "Dragon"])	Bobby	Bobby; The Proof; Millennium; Jay; DK; DEE.P	DEE.P; Millennium; The Proof	3:08
3.	"For Real?" (말도 안 돼 "Maldo An Dwae" [lit. "Nonsense"])	DK, Bobby	DK; Kang Uk-jin; Diggy; Lee Chang-woo	Kang Uk-jin; Diggy; Lee Chang-woo	3:23
4.	"Gold" (금 "Geum" [lit. "Gold"])	Yoon; Bobby	Yoon; Kang Uk-jin; Diggy	Kang Uk-jin; Diggy	2:45
5.	"Name" (그대 이름 "Geudae Ireum" [lit. "Your Name"])	DK; Bobby; Sonny; Se.A	DK; Kang Uk-jin; Diggy; Sonny	Kang Uk-jin; Diggy	3:57
Total length:					16:47

CD only
No.	Title	Lyrics	Music	Arrangement	Length
6.	"At Ease" (열중쉬어 "Yeoljungswieo" [lit. "Take a Break"])	Mino; Bobby	Mino; Future Bounce	Future Bounce	3:29
Total length:					20:15

== Charts ==
Chart (2022)	Peak position
South Korean Albums (Gaon)	2
Japanese Albums (Oricon)	10

== Release history ==
Release dates and formats for Flashback
Region	Date	Format(s)	Edition(s)	Label
Various	May 3, 2022	Digital download; streaming	Standard	YG
South Korea	May 10, 2022	CD (9 versions: Photobook (Red and Green), Digipack (one for each member) and Kit)	Standard	YG
