= Koo Jun-hoe =

South Korean singer (born 1997)

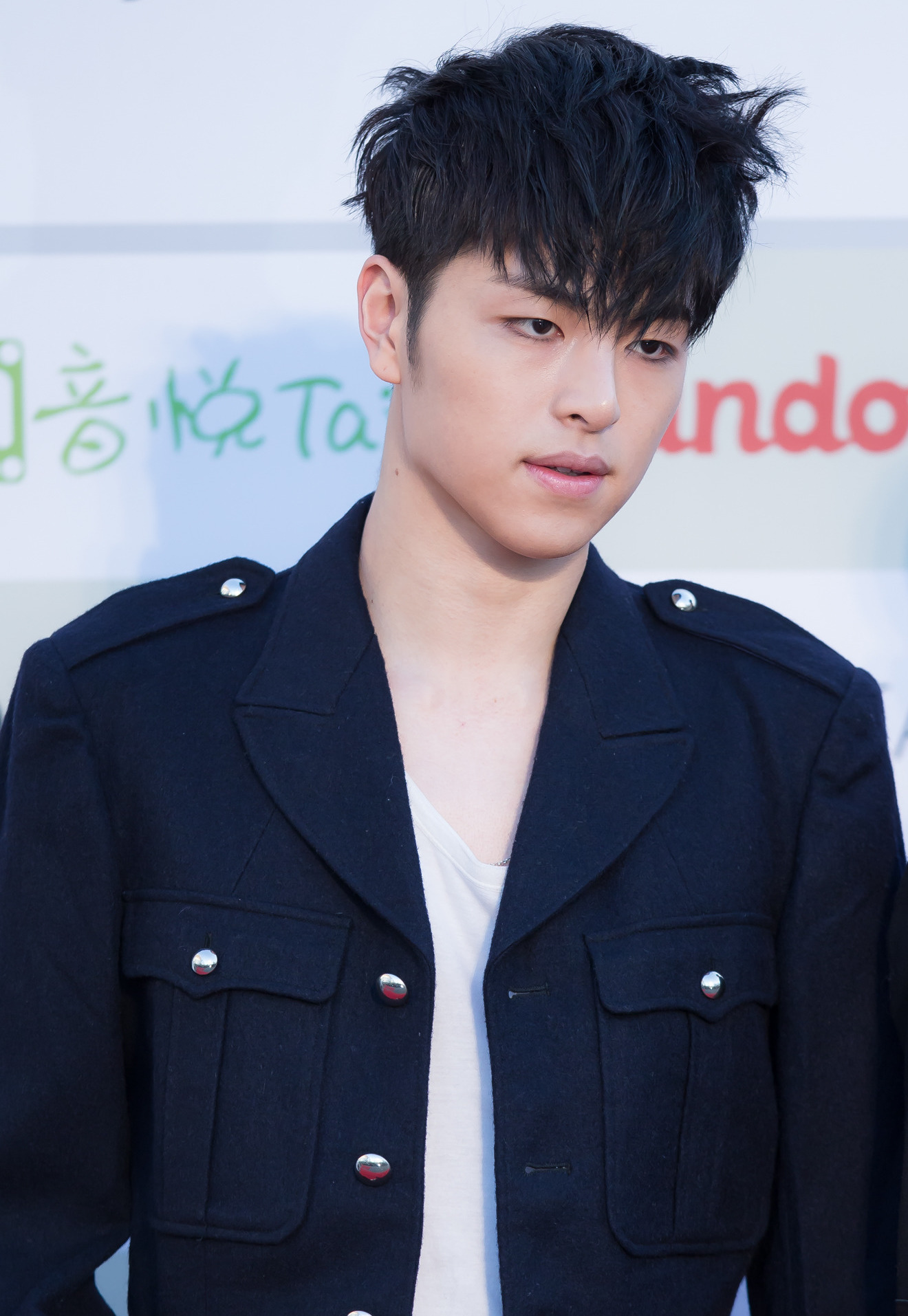
- Koo in 2016
- Born: March 31, 1997 (age 29); Seoul, South Korea
- Occupations: Singer; songwriter; actor
- Musical career
- Genre: K-pop
- Instrument: Vocals
- Years active: 2009–present
- Labels: YG; 143
- Member of: iKon

Korean name
- Hangul: 구준회
- Hanja: 具俊會
- RR: Gu Junhoe
- MR: Ku Chunhoe

Stage name
- Hangul: 주네
- RR: June
- MR: Chune

Koo Jun-hoe (Korean: 구준회, born March 31, 1997), also known by the stage name Ju-ne, is a South Korean singer and actor. He is a member of boy group iKon under 143 Entertainment. He has made appearances on survival programs WIN: Who Is Next and Mix & Match in 2013 and 2014 respectively.

== Early life ==
Koo Jun-hoe was born on March 31, 1997, in Seoul, South Korea. In March 2009, he made his first television appearance on SBS' Star King as "13 year old Michael Jackson". In 2011, Jun-hoe appeared on the first season of SBS' K-pop Star. Following elimination from the show, in April 2012, he was scouted by YG Entertainment and joined the company as a trainee.

== Career ==
=== 2013–2020: WIN: Who Is Next, Mix & Match and iKon ===
In 2013 Jun-hoe joined Mnet reality survival program WIN: Who Is Next as a member of Team B. The show ended with Team A winning and going on to debut as Winner, and Team B returning to train under the YG label. Soon after, in 2014, YG Entertainment announced the members of Team B would be competing again in a second reality survival show, Mix & Match. The show resulted in the debut of all Team B members alongside Jung Chan-woo under the name iKon.

On September 15, 2015, iKon debuted the pre-release single "My Type", following soon after with the lead singles "Rhythm Ta" and "Airplane", with Jun-hoe participating in the production for "Rhythm Ta". On October 4, 2015, iKon made their first music show appearance on SBS' Inkigayo, simultaneously receiving their third win for single "My Type".

=== 2021–present: Acting debut ===
In October 2021, Jun-hoe received his first acting project on the big screen with a supporting role in the film Again 1997. The following year, he was confirmed to star in the television drama True to Love. The drama premiered ahead of Again 1997 making True to Love his acting debut.

On July 28, 2026, 143 Entertainment announced that Junhoe would enlist for his mandatory military service on August 10. The agency stated that no official event would be held on the day of his enlistment and asked fans not to visit the site for safety reasons. Ahead of his enlistment, Junhoe shared a farewell message with fans, expressing his gratitude and promising to return in good health after completing his service.

== Personal life ==
Jun-hoe has shared his interest and participation in studying Brazilian jiu-jitsu since 2017. As of August 23, 2020, Jun-hoe has reached the mastery level of white belt with 3 black stripes.

== Discography ==
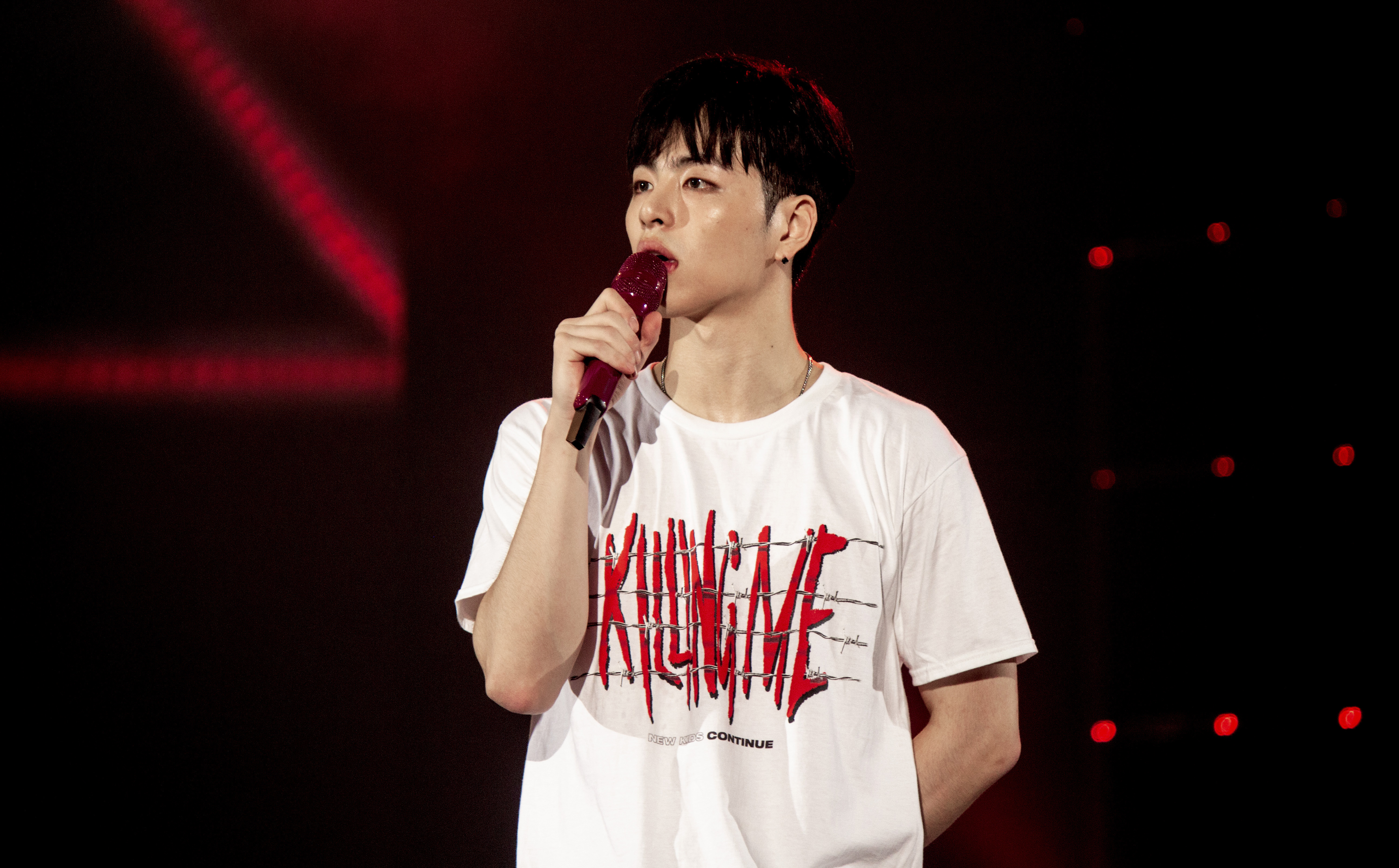
Koo at the iKon 2018 Continue Tour in Seoul

=== Singles ===
Title	Year	Peak chart positions	Sales	Album
Title	Year	KOR	Sales	Album
Lead singles
"Feel Lost"	2024	—	—	Bruise
"Hope"	2024	—	—	Bruise
Collaborations
"It's Love" (사랑인걸) (with Bobby & Donghyuk)	2016	41	KOR: 54,668	Non-Album Single
"Night Flight" (with SOULBYSEL)	2023	—	—	SOULBYSEL Compilation 05
As featured artist
"Raining" (with Bobby)	2021	—	—	Lucky Man
Soundtrack appearances
"Accidental Love"	2023	—	—	True to Love OST
"—" denotes items that did not chart or were not released in that region.

=== Composition credits ===
All song credits are adapted from the Korea Music Copyright Association's database, unless otherwise noted.

Year	Artist	Album	Song	Lyrics		Music		Ref.
Year	Artist	Album	Song	Credited	With	Credited	With	Ref.
2013	Team B	WIN Final Battle	"Climax"	Yes	Bobby, Jay, B.I	Yes	Lydia Paek, B.I, CHOICE 37	
2015	iKon	Welcome Back	"Rhythm Ta" (리듬 타)	No	Bobby, B.I	Yes	B.I, FUTURE BOUNCE	
2015	iKon	Welcome Back	"Rhythm Ta Remix (Rock Ver.)"	No	Bobby, B.I	Yes	B.I, FUTURE BOUNCE	
2018	iKon	Return	"Love Me" (나를 사랑하지 않나요)	Yes	Bobby, B.I, KUSH	Yes	B.I, KUSH, CHOICE 37	
2020	iKon	Non-Album Single	"Deep Night" (깊은 밤)	Yes	Bobby	Yes	THE PROOF (박성호)	
2023	iKon	Take Off	"Like a Movie" (영화처럼)	Yes	Bobby	Yes	Kang Uk-jin	
2023	iKon	Take Off	"Want You Back"	Yes	-	Yes	HAE, CHOICE 37	

== Filmography ==
=== Film ===
Year	Title		Role	Ref.
Year	English	Korean	Role	Ref.
2024	Again 1997	어게인 1997	No Bong-gyun	

=== Television series ===
Year	Title		Role	Ref.
Year	English	Korean	Role	Ref.
2023	True to Love	보라! 데보라	Yang Jin-ho	
2023	Twinkling Watermelon	반짝이는 워터멜론	Goo Jun-hyung	
2024	Marry You	결혼해YOU	Choi Ki-joon	
2025	No Mercy	단죄	Park Jeong-hun	

=== Television shows ===
Year	Title		Role	Notes	Ref.
Year	English	Korean	Role	Notes	Ref.
2009	Star King	놀라운 대회 스타킹	Participant	13-year-old Michael Jackson	
2011	K-pop Star	K팝 스타	Contestant	Lead Rapper	
2013	WIN: Who Is Next	윈:후 이즈 넥스트	Contestant	Member of Team B	
2014	Mix & Match	믹스 앤 매치	Contestant	Formation of iKon	
2018	King of Mask Singer	복면가왕	Contestant	Episodes 139–140	
2018	It's Dangerous Beyond the Blankets	이불 밖은 위험해	Cast member	Episodes 2–3	
2022	One Tree Table	외나무식탁	Cast member		
