= Dumb & Dumber (song) =

- Digital/Regular cover

Single by iKon
- Language: Japanese
- B-side: "#WYD"; "Love Me"; "Sinosijak (Remix)"
- Released: December 24, 2015
- Recorded: 2015
- Studio: YG (Seoul)
- Genre: J-pop, dance-pop
- Length: 28:14
- Label: YGEX
- Producer: B.I

"Dumb & Dumber" is the first Japanese song by South Korean boy group iKon. The debut single was released by YGEX on December 24, 2015. The debut single has three B-side songs, "#WYD" and "Sinosijak (Remix)" with a new song "Love Me".

== Commercial performance ==
The song debuted at number one on Japan's official chart Oricon Singles Chart with 48,749 physical copies sold in the first week, while on Billboard Japan, the song debuted also at number one on Japan Hot 100 and Hot Single Sales with total 114,653 on the first week.

In Oricon singles year end chart, the song charted in No.93 selling 60,887.

== Track listings and formats ==
No.	Title	Music	Length
1.	"Dumb & Dumber"	Future Bounce, B.I	4:01
2.	"#WYD"	Choice37, Kush	3:31
3.	"Love Me"	Choice37, Kush, B.I, Koo Jun-hoe	3:28
4.	"Sinosijak" (Remix)	B.I, Kang Uk-jin, Ham Seung-chun	3:06
Total length:			28:14

== Charts ==
Chart (2015)	Peak position
Japanese Billboard Japan Hot 100	1
Japanese Billboard Japan Top Singles Sales	1
Japanese Oricon Weekly Singles Chart	1

== Certifications ==
Region	Certification	Certified units/sales
Japan (RIAJ)	Gold	100,000^{^}
^{^} Shipments figures based on certification alone.

== Release history ==
Country	Release date	Format	Label	Ref.
Japan	December 24, 2015	Digital download, CD, DVD	YG Entertainment; YGEX	
