= Jung Chan-woo (singer) =

South Korean singer and actor (born 1998)

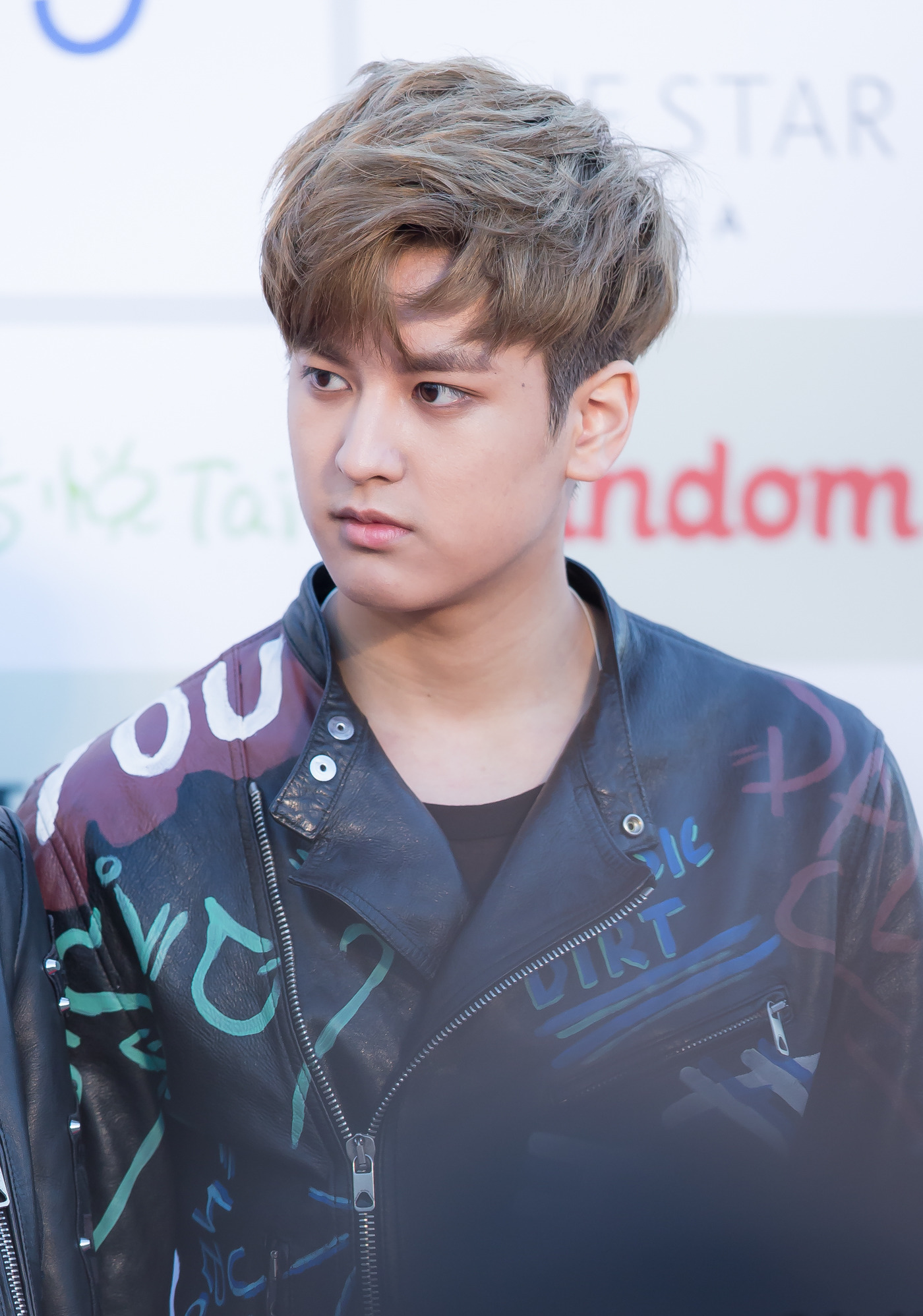
- Jung on the red carpet of the 2016 Gaon Chart K-Pop Awards
- Born: January 26, 1998 (age 28); Songpa-gu, Seoul, South Korea
- Occupations: Singer; actor; YouTuber
- Musical career
- Genre: K-pop
- Instrument: Vocals
- Years active: 2006–present
- Labels: YG; 143
- Member of: iKon
- Formerly of: YG Family

YouTube information
- Channel: 찬우살이
- Subscribers: 756 thousand
- Views: 33.9 million
- Last updated: August 3rd, 2026

Korean name
- Hangul: 정찬우
- Hanja: 鄭粲右
- RR: Jeong Chanu
- MR: Chŏng Ch'anu

Signature
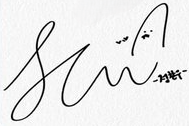

Jung Chan-woo (Korean: 정찬우; born January 26, 1998), better known mononymously as Chanwoo or his stage name Chan, is a South Korean singer and actor. He is a member of South Korean boy group iKon under 143 Entertainment. He is known for playing the younger counterparts of Lee Minho in both Boys Over Flowers (2009) and The Heirs (2013).

== Biography ==
=== Early life ===
Jung Chan-woo was born on January 26, 1998, in Songpa-gu, Seoul, and raised in Yongin, Gyeonggi Province, South Korea. In 2006, he appeared in the music video for TVXQ's "Balloons", as the younger Max Changmin. In 2008, he appeared in Lost and Found and several subsequent drama series, beginning with The Great King, Sejong. Jung played the younger version of Lee Min-ho's characters in both Boys Over Flowers and The Heirs.

=== 2014–present: Mix & Match and iKon ===
In late 2014, it was revealed that the YGE trainees from WIN: Who Is Next's Team B would return in another Mnet reality survival program Mix & Match. In addition, three new trainees were added to the competition, including Jung. The show resulted in the debut of all Team B members alongside Jung as a seven-member lineup under the name iKon. The group made their official debut on September 15, 2015, with the pre-release digital single "My Type".

In July 2018, Jung started his YouTube channel, named "Chan's Life (찬우살이)".

On September 30, 2021, it was announced that Jung will be continuing his acting career as one of the leads in a rom-com film/drama, titled My Chilling Roommate.

== Philanthropy ==
On April 8, 2019, it was reported Chan-woo donated ₩10 million to the Hope Bridge Association of the National Disaster Relief for the affected residents of the Gangwon wildfire in South Korea.

== Discography ==
=== Singles ===
| Title | Year | Album |
|---|---|---|
| "You" | 2024 | Non-album single |

== Filmography ==
=== Film ===
| Year | Title | | Role | Notes | Ref. |
| Year | English | Korean | Role | Notes | Ref. |
|---|---|---|---|---|---|
| 2008 | Lost and Found | 달콤한 거짓말 | Park Dong-shik (young) | Supporting role | |
| 2012 | Gabi | 가비 | Illichi (young) | Supporting role | |
| 2022 | My Chilling Roommate | 오싹한 동거 | Song Ji-chan | Lead role | |

=== Television series ===
| Year | Title | | Role | Notes | Ref. |
| Year | English | Korean | Role | Notes | Ref. |
|---|---|---|---|---|---|
| 2008 | The Great King, Sejong | 대왕 세종 | Prince Yang-Nyung (young) | Supporting role | |
| 2009 | Cain and Abel | 카인과 아벨 | Lee Seon-Woo (young) | Supporting role | |
| 2009 | The Slingshot | 남자이야기 | Do Jae-myeong (young) | Supporting role | |
| 2009 | Boys Over Flowers | 꽃보다 남자 | Gu Jun-pyo (young) | Supporting role | |
| 2009 | Heading to the Ground | 맨땅에 헤딩 | Cha Bong-gun (young) | Supporting role | |
| 2013 | The Heirs | 상속자들 | Kim Tan (young) | Supporting role | |

=== Television shows ===
| Year | Title | | Role | Notes | Ref. |
| Year | English | Korean | Role | Notes | Ref. |
|---|---|---|---|---|---|
| 2014 | Mix & Match | 믹스 앤 매치 | Contestant | Formation of iKon | |

=== Music video appearances ===
| Year | Title | Artist | Length | Ref. |
|---|---|---|---|---|
| 2006 | "Balloons" | TVXQ | 4:00 | |
