= BTBT =

Single by B.I and Soulja Boy featuring DeVita

from the EP Love or Loved Part.1
- Released: May 13, 2022
- Genre: R&B
- Length: 3:39
- Label: IOK; Transparent Arts
- Composers: The Stereotypes; 9am
- Lyricists: B.I; Soulja Boy; 3onawav; Ale Alberti

B.I singles chronology
"Cosmos" (2021)	"BTBT" (2022)	"Lullaby" (2022)

Music videos
- "BTBT" (story version) on YouTube
- "BTBT" (performance version) on YouTube

"BTBT" is a song by South Korean rapper, singer, songwriter, record producer and dancer B.I and American rapper and record producer Soulja Boy, featuring South Korean singer DeVita. It was released on May 13, 2022 by IOK and Transparent Arts, as a lead single from B.I's EP Love or Loved Part.1.

One year after its release, "BTBT" had exceeded 100 millions streams on Spotify and the dance performance film had been watched more than 50 millions times on YouTube. It was also selected by several magazines as one of the best K-pop songs of 2022, including Time and Nylon.

== Inspiration and production ==
According to B.I, "BTBT" is about the "passionate feelings you get when you meet somebody or start a relationship" and, more generally, the "powerful and rebellious kind of love we experience in our adolescence".

The word "BTBT" was derived from the Korean verb "비틀거리다" (biteulgeolida, Korean pronunciation: [pitʰɯɭɡʌ̹ɽida̠]), which means "to stagger", alluding to a metaphorical drunkenness caused by love. It is pronounced like an English acronym as the track's name, while it is sung "비틀비틀" (biteul biteul, Korean pronunciation: [pitʰɯɭ pitʰɯɭ]) in the chorus.

B.I explained that he wanted to work with DeVita on "BTBT" because he thought that her voice was well suited to the song. Soulja Boy's name was mentioned when B.I and his team were brainstorming about possible collaborators. B.I decided to ask the American rapper because he had liked his music ever since he was young.

== Release ==
"BTBT" was first announced by B.I's label on May 2, 2022 as a lead single from his upcoming EP Love or Loved Part.1. The title of the song was revealed on May 5, 2022, along with the involvement of Soulja Boy and DeVita.

A music video was released on May 13, 2022, at 00:00 KST, prior to the release of the single. It presented an alternative version of the song that excluded the verse from Soulja Boy, and only included DeVita's contribution. The single was then released on digital music and streaming platforms on May 13, 2022, at 13:00 KST. A second music video, called "performance film", was released on May 18, 2022, at 00:00 KST.

Comprising "BTBT" and four other songs, the EP Love or Loved Part.1 was released six months later, on November 18, 2022.

== Music videos and choreography ==
The first music video for "BTBT" was filmed in a cinematic way. Dressed in a leather outfit, B.I is wandering with a group of friends in a city that was described by the magazine Teen Vogue as "futuristic and cyberpunk-inspired". The director of the music video, South Korean creative director and musician Leesuho, said that it was referencing the cyberpunk film Ghost in the Shell.

The second music video shows B.I and twenty-one South Korean dancers performing a choreography by South Korean team Aitty Too. Some critics saw the influence of dancehall dances and house dance in their work for "BTBT". One of the team's members, Youngbeen, had previously choreographed for B.I's songs "Waterfall" and "Flame".

== Critical reception ==
MTV News included the pre-release single "BTBT" in its "Bop Shop" selection for the week of May 13, 2022. Describing the song as "intense and inspired" and "a unique recount of an experience with love at first sight", the publication stated that "B.I displays a deep sense of confidence and security with this comeback, combining his distinctive raspy vocals with a layered, bass-heavy track to create a genre completely his own".

In contrast, IZM writer Son Gi-ho found the song "monotonous" and rated it 1.5 out of 5 stars.

=== Accolades ===
"BTBT" was mentioned as one of the best K-pop songs of 2022 by numerous magazines. It was one of the ten songs Nylon included in its list of "The 20 Best K-pop releases of 2022", describing the song as a "hypnotic track". NME named it as the second best K-pop song of the year, explaining that "This sensuous R&B song, underlined by prominent bass and the syncopations of percussion, allows [B.I's] raspy, melodic voice to shine through".

Time picked "BTBT" for its list of "The Best K-Pop Songs and Albums of 2022 So Far", calling it a "groovy track that seduces with its smooth melodies as much as it does with its inviting lyrics". Dazed ranked the song fifth on its list of "The best K-pop tracks of 2022", while one of the pop culture writers invited by Teen Vogue to choose a song "that spoke to them and the world around them" said that "if there's one K-pop song in 2022 that you shouldn't miss, it's this one".

Year-end lists
Publisher	Year	Listicle	Work	Rank	Ref.
Nylon	2022	The 20 Best K-pop Releases of 2022	"BTBT"	—	
Time	2022	The Best K-Pop Songs and Albums of 2022	"BTBT"	—	
Leisure Byte	2022	15 Best Kpop Songs of 2022	"BTBT"	—	
Dazed	2022	The best K-pop tracks of 2022	"BTBT"	5	
Teen Vogue	2022	The 79 Best K-Pop Songs of 2022	"BTBT"	—	
Teen Vogue	2022	21 Best K-Pop Music Videos of 2022	"BTBT" music video	—	
NME	2022	The 25 best K-pop songs of 2022	"BTBT"	2	
The Telegraph (India)	2022	The Telegraph lookback at top 20 K-Pop hits of the year	"BTBT"	14	
The National (Abu Dhabi)	2022	The best K-pop songs of 2022	"BTBT"	—	
Paris Match	2022	The 10 best K-pop songs of 2022	"BTBT"	2	
Complex	2025	The 15 Best K-Pop and Rap Collaborations of All Time	"BTBT"	12	

== Commercial performance ==
"BTBT" did not enter South Korea's Circle Digital Chart upon release, but the global single had long-lasting commercial success, with good digital sales and streams reported by music platforms worldwide, including in Africa, Europe and the United States. In Southeast Asia, the song appeared on several national charts, reaching its peak position weeks after its release. It ranked 11th on the Billboard Vietnam Hot 100 for the week of May 27, 2022. In Malaysia, it was the 17th most streamed international single for the week of June 10. In Singapore, it placed 14th on the top 30 of the most streamed songs published by the RIAS for the week of June 17.

"BTBT" reached 100 millions total streams on the global music platform Spotify in May 2023, about one year after its release. The single was also one of the 25 most searched K-pop songs with the music recognition application Shazam in 2022.

Aitty Too's choreography was a major factor in the song's success. The dance performance film had been watched more than 37 million times on YouTube by November 2022, and has exceeded 50 million views as of March 2023. The hashtag #btbtchallenge, inviting users to cover the dance, had accumulated more than 130 million views on TikTok as of November 2022.

== Charts ==
Weekly chart performance for BTBT
Chart (2022)	Peak position
Malaysia International Singles (RIM)	17
Singapore (RIAS)	14
Vietnam Hot 100 (Billboard)	11
