= IKon =

South Korean boy band

iKon
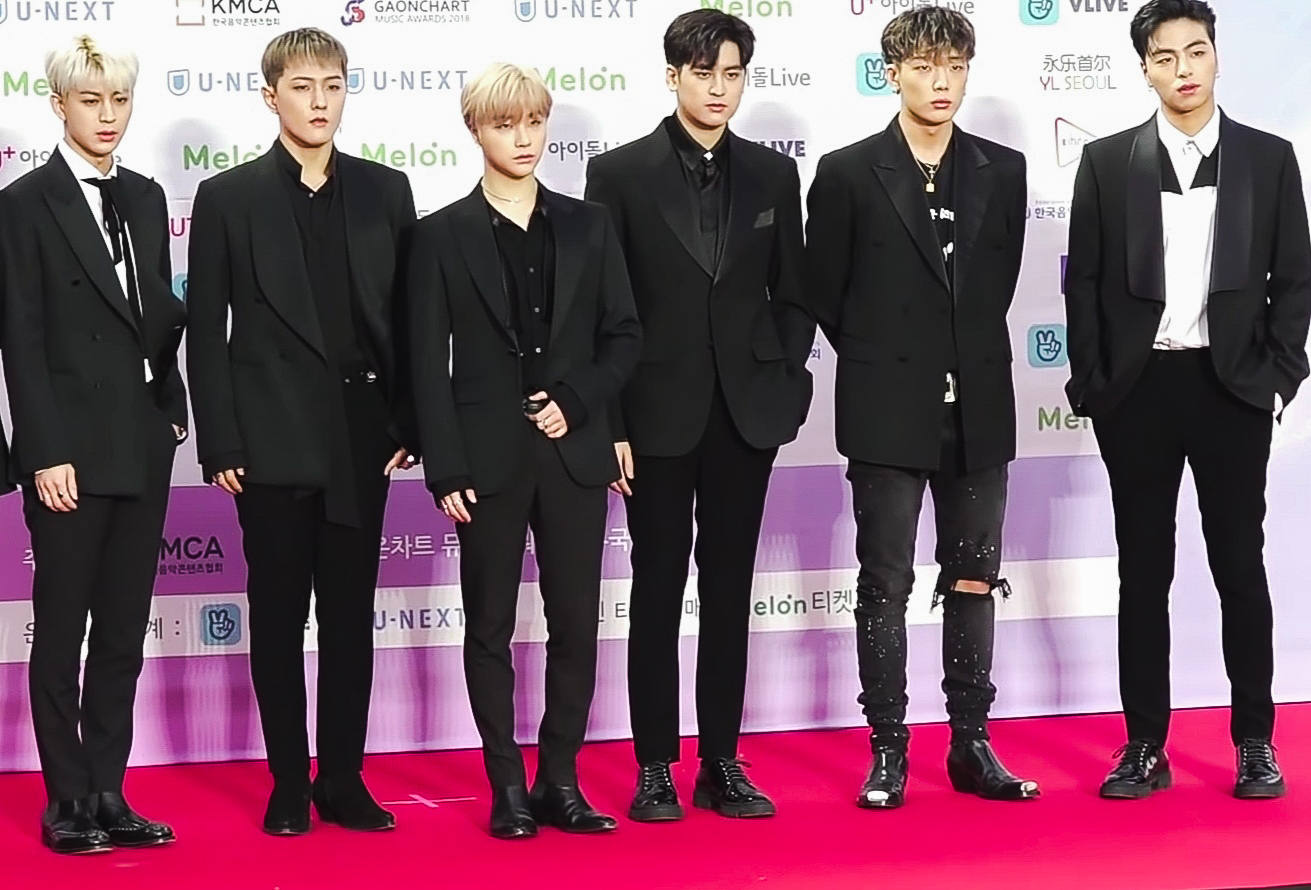
- iKon in January 2019; From left to right: Song, DK, Jay, Chan, Bobby, Ju-ne

Background information
- Origin: Seoul, South Korea
- Genres: K-pop; hip hop
- Years active: 2015–present
- Labels: YG; YGEX; 143
- Formerly of: YG Family
- Spinoffs: MOBB
- Members: Jay; Song; Bobby; DK; Ju-ne; Chan
- Past members: B.I
- Website: 143inc.kr/en/ikon

iKon (Korean: 아이콘; stylized as iKON) is a South Korean boy band formed in 2015 by YG Entertainment. The lineup consists of six members: Jay, Song, Bobby, DK, Ju-ne, and Chan. iKon was originally a seven-piece band; B.I departed from the group in June 2019.

Initially introduced in the reality survival show WIN: Who is Next as "Team B", the group went on to appear in the 2014 reality survival show Mix & Match, which determined the final members of iKon. Their debut studio album Welcome Back (2015) debuted atop the South Korean Gaon Album Chart and featured the number-one singles "My Type", "Apology", and "Dumb & Dumber", as well as the top-ten singles "Rhythm Ta", "Airplane", and "Anthem". The album was a commercial success, selling over 260,000 copies in Asia, and its tracks collectively sold over 4.8 million copies, leading the group to receive numerous accolades from major Asian music award shows.

From 2016 to 2017, iKon released the singles "#WYD" and "New Kids: Begin" and embarked on their first Asian tour and several Japanese tours. In 2018, their second studio album Return spawned the number-one single "Love Scenario", which topped the Gaon Digital Chart for a record-breaking six weeks. Their third EP, I Decide, was released on February 6, 2020. Their fourth EP, Flashback (2022), set a new personal record for highest one-day and one-week sales.

iKon departed YG Entertainment in December 2022, following the expiration of their contracts with the agency, and signed with 143 Entertainment. The group released their third studio album Take Off in May 2023.

== History ==
=== 2013–2014: Pre-debut and formation ===
Prior to the group's formation, group leader B.I featured on MC Mong's 2009 song "Indian Boy". He performed with MC Mong at the 2009 SBS Dream Concert, as well as on You Hee-yeol's Sketchbook. Vocalist Ju-ne, under his initial stage name Junhoe, made a pre-debut appearance aged thirteen on the SBS variety show Star King. He also competed on SBS' K-pop Star in 2011. On January 3, 2011, B.I and Jay (under his given name Jinhwan) joined YG Entertainment as trainees, followed by Bobby one week later. The trio trained together for one year and formed the basis of what became Team B. On April 18, 2012, Junhoe and Song (under his given name Yunhyeong) joined Team B. DK (under his given name Donghyuk) was the sixth member to join, on November 5, 2012.

In 2013, the six members participated as Team B on the Mnet reality survival show WIN: Who Is Next, competing against other trainees in Team A for the chance to debut as a group. The program involved three rounds of performances and public voting, with Team B eventually losing to Team A, who went on to debut as Winner. During the program, Team B released two singles: "Just Another Boy" and "Climax". The members subsequently appeared as backup dancers in Taeyang's music video for "Ringa Linga".

In June 2014, Team B appeared in the reality survival program Mix & Match, a follow-up to WIN: Who Is Next to determine the final lineup of the boy group iKon. YG Entertainment CEO Yang Hyun-suk stated that the group's name was derived from the goal to become an "icon for Korea", hence the "K". While Bobby, B.I, and Jinhwan were pre-confirmed members, the remaining members of Team B competed against three new trainees: Jung Jin-hyeong; Yang Hong-seok; and Jung Chan-woo, who had previously appeared on Korean television as a child actor. It was reported that 150,000 fans applied to attend the final performance of the show, and before the announcement of iKon's official lineup, YG Entertainment's blog server crashed. Ultimately, Junhoe, Donghyuk and Yunhyeong successfully retained their places in the lineup, with Chan-woo added as the group's final member.

Following the success of Mix & Match, iKon held fan meetings in South Korea, Japan, and China. In September, approximately 40,000 Japanese fans applied for 2,000 tickets to a fan meeting at Osaka Tojima River Forum, while over 50,000 Chinese fans applied for the group's fan meeting in Beijing. The program aired on December 29, 2014 on the CS channel in Japan. On December 15, 2014, iKon performed as the opening act at Bigbang's Japan Dome Tour 2014-2015 X. On January 28, 2015, Billboard listed the group as one of the "Top 5 K-Pop Artists to Watch in 2015", the only group on the list that had yet to debut.

=== 2015: Debut and Welcome Back ===
Following several postponements, iKon's official debut was announced on YG Entertainment's website for September 15, 2015. It was revealed that the group would be releasing their debut album Welcome Back in two parts, with six of the 12 tracks serving as singles. The first half of the album, Debut Half Album, was set to be released on October 1, followed by the Debut Full Album on November 2. The track listing for the first half-album was released on September 24. Group leader B.I was credited as a producer and co-composer on all of the album's tracks, with B.I and Bobby contributing to lyrics to all tracks and vocalist Ju-ne participating in the composition of the single "Rhythm Ta".

iKon debuted with the single "My Type", which was released with a music video on September 15, 2015. Within 24 hours, the music video surpassed 1.7 million views on YouTube. The group won their first music show trophy with the single on September 26, 2015 on MBC's Music Core, even though they had yet to make their first official live appearance. On September 24, "My Type" achieved a "triple crown" on the Gaon chart, having won the number one spot on the digital, download, and streaming charts simultaneously in the 39th week of 2015. On September 18, the single reached number one on the music video chart of Chinese music streaming sites QQ Music and Youku. iKon also trended on Weibo, where they were reportedly searched 1.3 billion times.

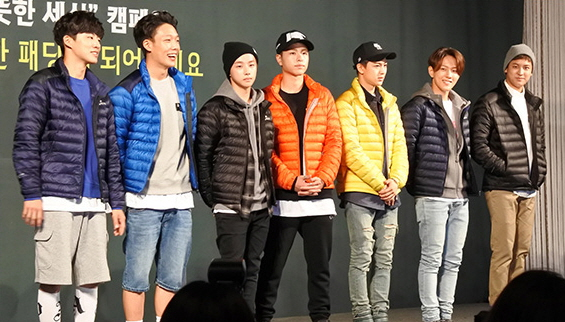
NEPA Warm World Campaign launch, September 2015

iKon's Debut Half Album was released digitally on October 1. The group held their first concert, Showtime, on October 3 at the Seoul Olympic Gymnastics Arena; tickets sold out 13,000 tickets. The concert being held at the largest concert hall in Korea was unprecedented for a new K-pop group at the time. The concert was broadcast live through Naver's V App and streamed by over 500,000 viewers.

On October 4, one day after their debut concert, the group made their music show debut on SBS' Inkigayo, performing "Rhythm Ta" and "Airplane" and receiving their third music show win for "My Type" in person. On October 8, they won on Mnet's M Countdown with "Rhythm Ta". According to the Gaon Music Charts, iKon topped the weekly album sales charts with the first half of Welcome Back for October 4–10.

In October, iKon embarked on a series of Japanese fan meetings titled "iKontact" in Tokyo, Aichi, Fukuoka and Osaka, attended by 26,600 fans. At the end of the month, iKon received a MelOn All-Kill Popularity Award, having sold 82,208 copies of the first half of Welcome Back. On October 28, it was announced that the full album's release would be delayed to December 14, with two additional digital singles released on November 16.

Two digital singles, "Apology" and "Anthem", were released on November 16. "Apology" reached number one spot on the Gaon Digital Chart in the 48th week of 2015. On December 24, three new singles, "Dumb & Dumber", "What's Wrong?" and "I Miss You So Bad" were released.

=== 2016: Japanese debut, Asian arena tours and new music ===
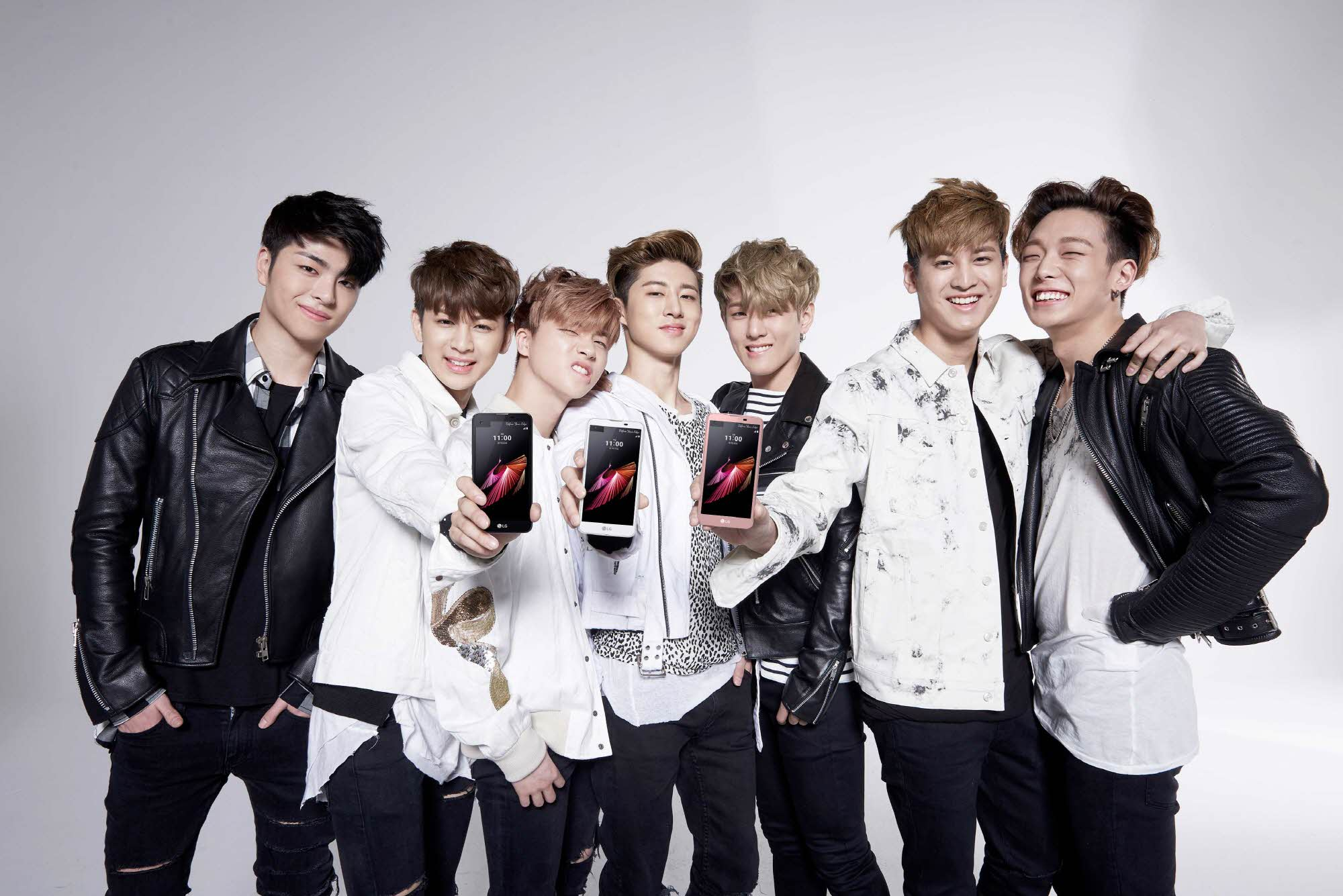
iKon for LG Corporation

On January 13, 2016, the group made their Japanese debut with Japanese version of their album Welcome Back; the album sold 61,508 copies in its first week of release and placed third on the weekly Oricon Albums Chart, earning them the New Artist Award and Best New Artist Award at the 58th Japan Record Award. The original Korean version of the album sold over 100,000 copies in Japan by the end of 2016.

On March 17, 2016, YG Entertainment announced that iKon would embark. on their first Asian tour, the iKoncert 2016: Showtime Tour, with dates in Taiwan, China, Hong Kong, Thailand, Singapore, Malaysia and Indonesia. On July 1, their agency announced the band's second Japanese arena tour, the iKon Japan Tour 2016, set to visit five cities for a total of 14 concerts and an attendance of 150,000 fans. Later, the company announced the addition of two shows to be held in Tokyo due to demand in tickets. The completion of the second tour brought the band's total concert attendance in their debut year to 322,000. In November 14, YGEX announced a second tour leg in Japan, the iKon Japan Tour 2017, due to the success of the previous arena tour, which would see the band visit Yokohama Arena for the first time. The second leg was attended by 120,000 fans from three cities.

On May 30, iKon released the digital single "#WYD". The song debuted at number three on the Gaon Digital Chart. On August 10, the release of iKon's first original Japanese single, Dumb & Dumber, was announced. The single was released on September 28 with a CD+DVD version and a CD version. It debuted at number one on both the daily and weekly editions of the Oricon Singles Chart.

The group participated in Chinese dance survival program Heroes of Remix in 2016 with Psy as their mentor. They were the most-winning artist on the show, winning three weeks and receiving a positive reviews for their performances. However, due to elevated political tensions between South Korea and China following the Terminal High Altitude Area Defense (THAAD) issue, iKon was edited out of the last episodes of the show. Their promotional activities and touring in China led them to win Asian Most Popular Korean Group at the China Music Awards, Best Group at the Netease Attitude Awards, and Best New Force Group and Album of the Year at the QQ Music Awards.

=== 2017: Japan Dome tour and New Kids album series ===
On February 11, 2017, it was announced that iKon would embark on their first dome tour, with two shows set to take place in Kyocera Dome and Seibu Prince Dome and an expected attendance of 90,000 fans. This made them the fastest group to hold a concert in a Japan dome since debuting. On June 18, an additional 22 concerts in eight Japanese cities were announced by YGEX, with 233,000 fans expected to attend, making it the longest and the largest arena tour held by the band in Japan.

On March 2, 2017, YG Entertainment confirmed that iKon had begun filming two music videos for their new album that was set to be released in April. An injury to Chanwoo's ankle causing the shooting to be delayed. It was confirmed that iKon would release an album series called New Kids throughout 2017. The first entry of the series, the single album titled New Kids: Begin, was released on May 22.

=== 2018–2019: Completion of the New Kids series and B.I's departure ===
iKon released their second studio album and the second entry of the group's four-part New Kids album series, Return, on January 25, 2018. The lead single "Love Scenario" was described as dance track with a circuitous melody and lyrics conveying a mellow yet upbeat reaction to a breakup. All 12 tracks of Return were co-written by members B.I and Bobby. Other artists including Psy, BigBang's Taeyang, and Epik High's Tablo also participated in songwriting alongside various YG Entertainment producers, including Choice37 and Teddy Park. "Love Scenario" topped the Gaon Digital Chart for six weeks, making iKon the first artist to achieve this milestone. It also topped the year-end Gaon Digital Chart for 2018. The group was named the top artist of the first half of 2018 by Genie Music, having placed first on their daily music chart for 35 days.

iKon embarked on another tour in 2018, visiting eight cities across Asia. It marked the group second Asian tour after their iKoncert 2016: Showtime Tour. The group visited Australia for the first time, playing two shows in Sydney and Melbourne. iKon completed their four-part New Kids album series with the release of their first and second extended plays, New Kids: Continue and New Kids: The Final, in August and October 2018, respectively.

On June 12, 2019, B.I announced his departure from the group and terminated his exclusive contract with YG Entertainment, following drug allegations.

=== 2020–2021: I Decide and Kingdom: Legendary War ===
iKon released their third EP, I Decide, on February 6, 2020, including the lead single "Dive". The EP, which was the group's first release since the departure of leader B.I in 2019, debuted at number three on the Gaon Album Chart.

On March 3, 2021, iKon returned with the new digital single "Why Why Why". Beginning. in April 2021, iKon competed in the reality competition series Kingdom: Legendary War alongside five other K-pop boy groups. In the show's finale, the group performed "At Ease" (열중쉬어), co-written and co-composed by labelmate Mino of Winner. "At Ease", along with the other participants' songs from the finale, was later included in a special EP titled Kingdom Finale: Who Is the King?.

=== 2022–present: Flashback, departure from YG Entertainment, and Take Off ===
iKon returned with their fourth EP, Flashback, on May 3, 2022, which included the lead single "But You". In July, the group held the iKon Japan Tour 2022 in Kobe and Tokyo, selling out most of the shows. On December 30, 2022, after seven years, the members of iKon departed from YG Entertainment following the completion of their contracts.

On January 1, 2023, all members of iKon signed with 143 Entertainment and announced plans to release a new album in April. On March 7, 2023, 143 Entertainment announced that iKon would embark on a world tour, 2023 iKon World Tour "Take Off", with performances in various countries across Asia, Europe, and North America. On April 18, 2023, it was confirmed that iKon's third studio album, Take Off, would be released on May 4.

== Members ==
Retrieved from their Naver profile.

=== Current ===
- Jay (제이)
- Song (송)
- Bobby (바비)
- DK (디케이)
- Ju-ne (준회)
- Chan (찬)

=== Former ===
- B.I (비아이) – leader

== Discography ==
Korean albums

- Welcome Back (2015)
- Return (2018)
- Take Off (2023)

Japanese albums

- New Kids (2019)
- Flashback [+ I Decide] (2022)

== Tours ==
Headlining

- iKoncert: Showtime Tour (2016)
- Japan Tour (2016–17)
- Japan Dome Tour (2017)
- Japan Tour (2018)
- Continue Tour (2018–19)
- iKon Japan Tour 'Flashback' (2022)
- iKon World Tour 'Take Off' (2023)
- iKon World Tour 'Fourever' (2026)

Joint tours

- YG Family – Power World Tour (as Team B) (2014)

Opening act

- Big Bang – Japan Dome Tour X (2014–15)

== Filmography ==
- WIN: Who Is Next (2013–14, Mnet)
- Mix And Match (2014–15, Mnet)
- Heroes of Remix (2016, JSTV)
- iKon Idol School Trip (2017, JTBC)
- iKon TV (2018, YouTube & JTBC)
- iKon Heart Racing Youth Trip (2018, Olleh TV)
- YG Future Strategy Office (2018, Netflix) (Note: Cameo in Episode 04.)
- Kingdom: Legendary War (2021, Mnet)
- Icon of Taste: One Summer Night (2021, Wavve)
- iKon On Air (2022, YouTube)

== Notes ==
Preceded by Magnolia Factory	Japan Record Award for Best New Artist; 2016	Succeeded by Camellia Factory
