= New Kids: Begin =

Single album by iKON
- Released: May 22, 2017
- Length: 7:13
- Label: YG
- Producer: B.I

IKON chronology
WYD (2016)	New Kids: Begin (2017)	Return (2018)

Singles from New Kids: Begin
- 1. "Bling Bling" Released: May 22, 2017; 2. "B-Day" Released: May 22, 2017

New Kids: Begin is the first single album by South Korean boy group iKON. It is the first album released since their single "#WYD" was released in May 2016, and their debut album "Welcome Back" was released in 2015.

The single album was a commercial success peaking at number 2 on the Gaon Album Chart. It has sold over 73,823 physical copies as of June 2017.

== Details ==
The album is released in two different versions, Dope and Bold. The digital album was released on May 22, 2017, worldwide, while the physical version was released at the YG e-shop and in record shops on May 23, 2017, in South Korea.

== Background ==
On March 2, 2017, YG Entertainment confirmed that iKON has begun the shooting of two music videos for their new album, set for release in April. During the shooting of the music video, Chanwoo injured his ankle. Consequently, shooting of the music video was delayed. On May 16, 2017, it was confirmed that they will release a new series of albums under the name New Kids. This series will be released continuously throughout 2017 and started on May 22, 2017, with the release of the album titled New Kids: Begin. YG Entertainment's Chief Executive Officer, Yang Hyun-Suk, talked about the concept of the album saying: "The concept for iKON’s comeback this year is ‘NEW KIDS’. It means iKON's ‘new beginning’ and ‘new style’, which also shows iKON's resolution and will to release ‘NEW KIDS’ series albums continuously during this year." The first teaser was released on May 16, 2017 and the date of release was announced. The following day, the first comeback teaser video was released on their official Youtube channel. On May 18, 2017, the first title song was announced, named "Bling Bling". iKON's members Bobby and B.I had worked on the lyrics, composition, and rearrangement of the song, jointly with YG's rookie producer Millennium. The following day they released the teaser for their second title track "B-Day". On May 22, 2017, music videos for both songs were released on the official iKON YouTube channel.

== Promotion ==
The first performance of "Bling Bling" was on May 20, 2017, during a concert at Japan's Kyocera Dome while on their first Japan Dome Tour. On May 22, 2017, they held a live countdown show on V LIVE to celebrate the release of their songs.

== Commercial performance ==
New Kids: Begin entered and peaked at number 2 on the Gaon Album Chart on the chart issue dated May 21–27, 2017. In its second week the single album fell to number 4 and to number 6 in its third week. The single album entered at number 5 on the chart for the month of May 2017 with 49,380 physical copies sold. It also charted for the month of June at number 10, with 24,443 additional copies, for a total of 73,823 physical copies sold since its release.

Both songs entered the Gaon Digital Chart, "Bling Bling" at number 24 and "B-Day" at number 36 on the chart issue dated May 21–27, 2017. The first with 57,704 digital downloads sold and the second with 44,433 digital downloads sold.

== Track listing ==
New Kids: Begin
No.	Title	Lyrics	Music	Arrangement	Length
1.	"Bling Bling"	B.I; Bobby; Millennium	B.I; Millennium	Millennium	3:39
2.	"B-Day" (벌떼; beoltte)	B.I; Bobby	B.I; Airplay; Kang Uk Jin	Airplay; Kang Uk Jin	3:35
Total length:					7:14

New Kids: Begin JPN
No.	Title	Lyrics	Music	Arrangement	Length
1.	"Bling Bling"	B.I; Bobby; Millennium	B.I; Millennium	Millennium	3:41
2.	"B-Day"	B.I; Bobby	B.I; Airplay; Kang Uk Jin	Airplay; Kang Uk Jin	3:35
3.	"Worldwide"	B.I; KUSH; Bobby; SUNNY BOY; TA-TROW	LDN Noise; KUSH; B.I		3:26
4.	"Perfect"	B.I; Shoko Fujibayashi	B.I; DEE.P		3:37
5.	"My Type Remix (Acoustic Ver.)"	B.I; Bobby; KUSH; SUNNY BOY	CHOICE37; KUSH; B.I		3:37
6.	"Bling Bling -KR Ver.-"	B.I; Bobby; Millennium	B.I; Millennium	Millennium	3:41
7.	"B-Day -KR Ver.-"	B.I; Bobby	B.I; Airplay; Kang Uk Jin	Airplay, Kang Uk Jin	3:36
8.	"Bling Bling -Inst.-"	B.I; Bobby; Millennium	B.I; Millennium	Millennium	3:41
9.	"B-Day -Inst.-"	B.I; Bobby	B.I; Airplay; Kang Uk Jin	Airplay, Kang Uk Jin	3:36
10.	"Worldwide -Inst.-"	B.I; KUSH; Bobby; SUNNY BOY; TA-TROW	LDN Noise; KUSH; B.I		3:24
11.	"Perfect -Inst.-"	B.I; Shoko Fujibayashi	B.I; DEE.P		3:35
Total length:					39:29

== Sales ==
Chart	Sales
South Korea	73,823
Japan	36,186

== Release history ==
Region	Date	Format	Label	Ref
Worldwide	May 22, 2017	Digital download	YG Entertainment	
South Korea	May 23, 2017	CD	YG Entertainment, KT Music	
Japan	August 16, 2017	CD, digital download	YGEX	
