= List of iKon concert tours =

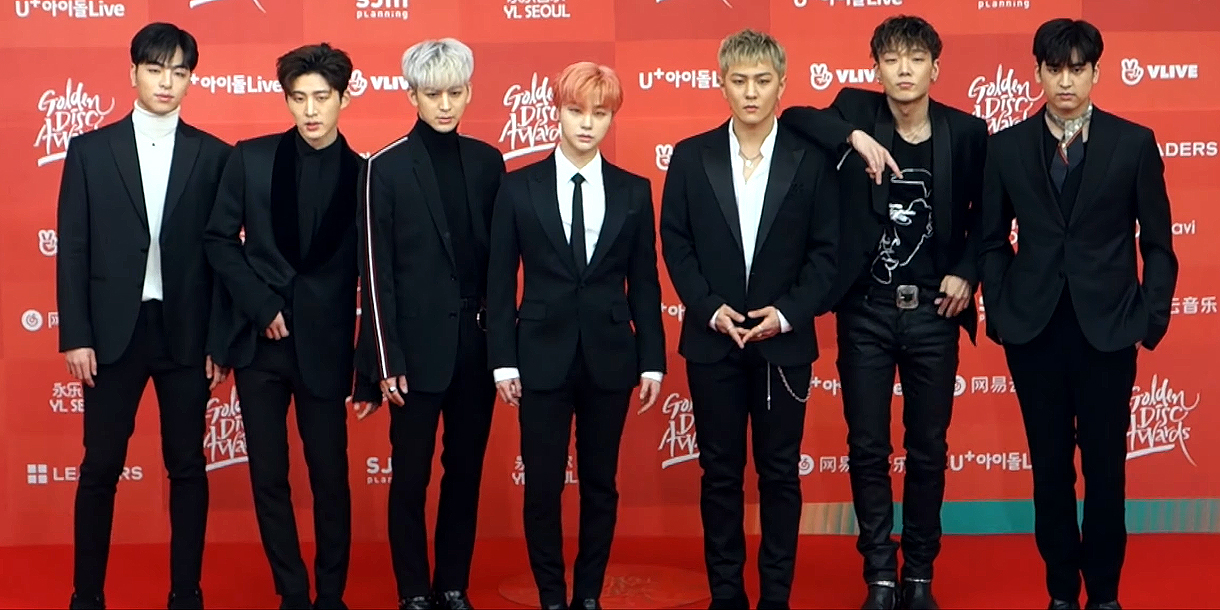
iKon at the 2019 Gaon Chart Music Awards

South Korean idol group iKon held their debut concert under the name "Showtime" at the Olympics Gymnastics Arena in Seoul on October 3, 2015. Since then, they have embarked on an Asian tour under the name "iKoncert 2016 Showtime Tour", two Japanese tours, the second of which was a dome tour in 2017, and a fan meeting tour in 2015 under the name "iKontact", which visited China and Japan. In total, iKon has gathered over a million fans from their tours so far.

== Tours ==
=== iKON Japan Tour 2016–2017 ===
iKON Japan Tour 2016–2017 is the second arena tour by the band, initially set to visit five cities for a total of 14 concerts, and was expected to gather 150,000 fans. Additional two concerts were announced on August 26 after receiving requests for more tickets. The concerts will be held at the Yoyogi National Gymnasium in Tokyo on October 26. This raises the expected attendance to 176,000 people.

Winner's Mino featured as a guested in the entire tour, as a part of his duo MOBB with Bobby. The first shows in Chiba successfully opened the tour with total 32,000 fans. On November 14, YGEX announced nine more dates, to extend the tour till 2017, and to visit Yokohama Arena for the first time. The second leg is expected to draw 120,000 fans.

Setlist
1. "Dumb & Dumber"
2. "Sinosijak"
3. "What's Wrong?"
4. "Welcome Back"
5. "My Type"
6. "Be I" (B.I)
7. "Holup!" (Bobby)
8. "Full House" (MOBB)
9. "Body" (Mino)
10. "Apology"
11. "I Miss You So Bad"
12. "Just Go"
13. "Airplane"
14. "#WYD"
15. "Today"
16. "Love Me"
17. "Rhythm Ta"
18. "Just Another Boy"
19. "Climax"
20. "M.U.P"

Encore

21. "Sinosijak"
22. "Dumb & Dumber"
23. "Wait For Me"

Tour dates
Date	City	Country	Venue	Attendance
September 10, 2016 (Two shows)	Chiba	Japan	Makuhari Messe	176,000
September 11, 2016 (Two shows)	Chiba	Japan	Makuhari Messe	176,000
September 24, 2016 (Two shows)	Aichi Prefecture	Japan	Nihon Gaishi Hall	176,000
September 25, 2016	Aichi Prefecture	Japan	Nihon Gaishi Hall	176,000
October 5, 2016	Osaka	Japan	Osaka-jō Hall	176,000
October 6, 2016 (Two shows)	Osaka	Japan	Osaka-jō Hall	176,000
October 8, 2016 (Two shows)	Kobe	Japan	World Memorial Hall	176,000
October 10, 2016 (Two shows)	Fukuoka	Japan	Marine Messe Fukuoka	176,000
October 26, 2016 (Two shows)	Tokyo	Japan	Yoyogi National Gymnasium	176,000
February 10, 2017	Osaka	Japan	Osaka-jō Hall	120,000
February 11, 2017 (Two shows)	Osaka	Japan	Osaka-jō Hall	120,000
March 11, 2017 (Two shows)	Fukuoka	Japan	Marine Messe Fukuoka	120,000
March 18, 2017	Yokohama	Japan	Yokohama Arena	120,000
March 19, 2017	Yokohama	Japan	Yokohama Arena	120,000
March 20, 2017 (Two shows)	Yokohama	Japan	Yokohama Arena	120,000
Total				296,000

=== iKON Japan Tour 2018 ===
iKON Japan Tour 2018 is the fourth Japan tour by the band, set to visit four cities for a total of 13 concerts, and was expected to gather 170,000 fans.

Tour dates
Date	City	Country	Venue	Attendance
August 24, 2018	Fukuoka	Japan	Fukuoka Kokusai Center	190,000
August 25, 2018 (Two shows)	Fukuoka	Japan	Fukuoka Kokusai Center	190,000
August 26, 2018	Fukuoka	Japan	Fukuoka Kokusai Center	190,000
September 5, 2018 (Two shows)	Nagoya	Japan	Aichi Prefectural Gymnasium	190,000
September 13, 2018	Tokyo	Japan	Tokyo International Forum Hall A	190,000
September 14, 2018	Tokyo	Japan	Tokyo International Forum Hall A	190,000
November 6, 2018	Tokyo	Japan	Nippon Budokan	190,000
November 7, 2018	Tokyo	Japan	Nippon Budokan	190,000
December 22, 2018	Osaka	Japan	Kyocera Dome Osaka	190,000
December 23, 2018	Osaka	Japan	Kyocera Dome Osaka	190,000

Cancelled shows
Date	City	Country	Venue	Reason
September 4, 2018	Nagoya	Japan	Aichi Prefectural Gymnasium	Typhoon No. 21

=== iKON Japan Tour 2019 ===
Tour dates
Date	City	Country	Venue	Attendance
July 27, 2019	Fukuoka	Japan	Marine Messe Fukuoka	—
July 28, 2019	Fukuoka	Japan	Marine Messe Fukuoka	—
August 9, 2019	Kobe	Japan	World Memorial Hall	—
August 10, 2019	Kobe	Japan	World Memorial Hall	—
August 11, 2019	Kobe	Japan	World Memorial Hall	—
August 12, 2019	Kobe	Japan	World Memorial Hall	—
August 21, 2019	Nagoya	Japan	Nagoya Congress Center	—
August 22, 2019	Nagoya	Japan	Nagoya Congress Center	—
August 23, 2019	Nagoya	Japan	Nagoya Congress Center	—
August 25, 2019	Miyagi Prefecture	Japan	Xebio Arena Sendai	—
September 7, 2019	Chiba	Japan	Makuhari Messe	—
September 8, 2019	Chiba	Japan	Makuhari Messe	—
September 18, 2019	Osaka	Japan	Osaka-jō Hall	—
September 19, 2019	Osaka	Japan	Osaka-jō Hall	—

=== iKON Japan Tour 2020 ===
Tour dates
Date	City	Country	Venue	Attendance
April 11, 2020	Fukuoka	Japan	Marine Messe Fukuoka	—
April 12, 2020	Fukuoka	Japan	Marine Messe Fukuoka	—
April 21, 2020	Osaka	Japan	Osaka-jō Hall	—
April 22, 2020	Osaka	Japan	Osaka-jō Hall	—
April 23, 2020	Osaka	Japan	Osaka-jō Hall	—
April 25, 2020	Chiba	Japan	Makuhari Messe	—
April 26, 2020	Chiba	Japan	Makuhari Messe	—
May 25, 2020	Aichi	Japan	Aichi Sky Expo Hall A	—
May 26, 2020	Aichi	Japan	Aichi Sky Expo Hall A	—

=== iKON Film Concert Tour 2021 ===
iKON Film Concert Tour 2021 is a replay from "iKON Year End Live 2019" that held in Yokohama on December 24, 2019, with immersive sound and iKON 's overwhelming live performance .

Tour dates
Date	City	Country	Venue	Attendance
December 5, 2021 (Three shows)	Fukuoka	Japan	Fukuoka International Congress Center Main Hall	—
December 11, 2021 (Three shows)	Aichi	Japan	Nagoya Congress Center Century Hall	—
December 18, 2021 (Three shows)	Kobe	Japan	Kobe International Hall Kokusai Hall	—
December 24, 2021 (Three shows)	Yokohama	Japan	Pacifico Yokohama Main Hall	—
December 24, 2021 (Three shows)	Yokohama	Japan	Pacifico Yokohama Main Hall	—

=== iKON Japan Tour 2022 “FLASHBACK” ===
Tour dates
Date	City	Country	Venue	Attendance
July 2, 2022 (Two shows)	Kobe	Japan	World Memorial Hall	—
July 3, 2022	Kobe	Japan	World Memorial Hall	—
July 9, 2022 (Two shows)	Tokyo	Japan	Yoyogi National Gymnasium	—
July 10, 2022	Tokyo	Japan	Yoyogi National Gymnasium	—
October 22, 2022	Osaka	Japan	Osaka-jō Hall	—
October 23, 2022 (Two shows)	Osaka	Japan	Osaka-jō Hall	—

=== iKON World Tour 2023 'TAKE OFF' ===
Tour dates
Date	City	Country	Venue	Attendance
Asia
May 5, 2023	Seoul	South Korea	Jangchung Arena	—
May 6, 2023	Seoul	South Korea	Jangchung Arena	—
May 21, 2023	Taipei	Taiwan	Taipei Arena	—
May 26, 2023	Tokyo	Japan	Garden Theater	—
May 27, 2023	Tokyo	Japan	Garden Theater	—
Europe
June 24, 2023	Essen	Germany	Grugahalle	—
June 28, 2023	Florence	Italy	Nelson Mandela Forum	—
July 1, 2023	Paris	France	Zénith Paris - La Villette	—
Asia
July 8, 2023	Osaka	Japan	Osaka Municipal Central Gymnasium	—
July 9, 2023	Osaka	Japan	Osaka Municipal Central Gymnasium	—
July 22, 2023	Kuala Lumpur	Malaysia	Axiata Arena	—
July 29, 2023	Bangkok	Thailand	IMPACT Exhibition Hall 5	—
August 5, 2023	Manila	Philippines	Araneta Coliseum	—
North America
September 5, 2023	New York City	United States	Kings Theatre	—
September 7, 2023	Atlanta	United States	The Eastern	—
September 9, 2023	Chicago	United States	Auditorium Theatre	—
September 11, 2023	Dallas	United States	Gilley's	—
September 14, 2023	Denver	United States	Bellco Theatre	—
September 16, 2023	Los Angeles	United States	Shrine Auditorium	—
Asia
October 11, 2023	Osaka	Japan	Osaka-jō Hall	—
October 12, 2023	Osaka	Japan	Osaka-jō Hall	—
November 19, 2023	Jakarta	Indonesia	Tennis Indoor Senayan	—
December 9, 2023	Macau	China	Studio City (Macau)	—

== Concerts ==
=== iKON Debut Concert Showtime ===
Concert dates
Date	City	Country	Venue	Attendance
October 3, 2015	Seoul	Korea	Olympic Gymnastics Arena	13,000

=== iKON X'mas LIVE 2017 ===
Concert dates
Date	City	Country	Venue	Attendance
December 9, 2017	Yokohama	Japan	Yokohama Arena	30,000
December 10, 2017	Yokohama	Japan	Yokohama Arena	30,000

=== iKON Year End LIVE 2019 ===
Concert dates
Date	City	Country	Venue	Attendance
December 14, 2019 (Two shows)	Nagoya	Japan	Aichi Japan Special Ceramic Industry Civil Hall Forest Hall	—
December 15, 2019	Nagoya	Japan	Aichi Japan Special Ceramic Industry Civil Hall Forest Hall	—
December 24, 2019 (Two shows)	Yokohama	Japan	Yokohama Cultural Gymnasium	—
December 25, 2019	Yokohama	Japan	Yokohama Cultural Gymnasium	—
December 30, 2019 (Two shows)	Kobe	Japan	Kobe World Memorial Hall	—
December 31, 2019	Kobe	Japan	Kobe World Memorial Hall	—

=== iKON 2022 Concert [FLASHBACK] ===
Concert dates
Date	City	Country	Venue	Attendance
June 25, 2022	Seoul	Korea	Olympic Hall	4,000
June 26, 2022	Seoul	Korea	Olympic Hall	4,000

== Private stages ==
Event name	Date	City	Country	Venue	Attendance
iKON Private Stage RE·-KONNECT	March 11, 2018	Seoul	South Korea	Olympic Hall	3,000
iKON Private Stage KOLORFUL	June 9, 2018	Seoul	South Korea	Olympic Hall	3,000
iKON Private Stage KEMiSTRY	May 11, 2019 (Two shows)	Seoul	South Korea	Jangchung Arena	—

== Other live performances ==
Event name	Date	City	Country	Venue
Saranghaeyo Indonesia 2017	November 25, 2017	Jakarta	Indonesia	ICE BSD Hall 5
Perfect Valentine 2018	February 12, 2018	Yokohama	Japan	Yokohama Arena
Asian Games 2018 Jakarta Palembang Closing Ceremony	February 12, 2018	Jakarta	Indonesia	Gelora Bung Karno Stadium
Perfect Valentine 2019	February 11, 2019	Yokohama	Japan	Yokohama Arena
Samsung Unleash Next Gen Bold	February 21, 2019	Sentosa	Singapore	Resorts World Sentosa
iKON x Samsung Galaxy S10 Launch Event	February 25, 2019	Bangkok	Thailand	Central World (Square A)
Galaxy Launch Party	February 26, 2019	Manila	Philippines	Cove Manila
SXSW Conference and Festival	March 13, 2018	Austin	United States	Moody Theater
Samsung 837 Fortnite Event	March 16, 2019	New York City	United States	Samsung 837
Head in the Clouds Festival	August 17, 2019	Los Angeles	United States	Los Angeles State Historic Park
Gudfest 2019 in Jakarta	November 2, 2019	Jakarta	Indonesia	Gelora Bung Karno Sports Complex
2020 Applewood Festa	January 18, 2020	Bangkok	Thailand	Impact Arena
KCON:TACT 3	March 25, 2021	—	—	—
KCON:TACT 4 U	June 26, 2021	—	—	—
Waterbomb in Busan	July 30, 2022	Busan	South Korea	Busan Asiad Auxiliary Stadium
Kpop Masterz 2 Manila	September 23, 2022	Manila	Philippines	Smart Araneta Coliseum
Kpop Masterz 2 Bangkok	September 25, 2022	Bangkok	Thailand	BITEC Bangna
Jisphoria	October 1, 2022	Jakarta	Indonesia	Jakarta International Stadium
KAMP in LA	October 15, 2022	Los Angeles	United States	Rose Bowl Stadium
Kamp Fest CDMX	August 19, 2023	Mexico City	Mexico	Palacio de los Deportes
WOW K-Music Festival	October 22, 2023	Ho Chi Minh City	Vietnam	Vạn Phúc City Urban Area
