= WYD (song) =

2016 single by iKON

Single by iKon
- Released: May 30, 2016
- Genre: Hip hop; R&B
- Length: 3:31
- Label: YG
- Composer(s): Kush; Choice37
- Lyricist(s): Kush; B.I; Bobby

IKon singles chronology
| "Welcome Back" (2015) | "WYD" (2016) | "New Kids: Begin" (2017) |

"#WYD" (Korean: 오늘 모해) is a song by South Korean boy group iKon. The single was released by YG Entertainment on May 30, 2016. The song is the first release after their debut album in 2015.

== Background ==
On May, the group members released a series of teaser images of conversation on on-line messenger and selfies, as well as a message to virtual girlfriend, to announce iKon's comeback, On May 25, YG Entertainment released a teaser poster that reads "Who's Next?", the following day the date of the release was announced as May 30, on May 27 it was reviled that iKON will be releasing new single titled "#WYD" (short for "What You Doing"). The song was written by Kush, B.I, and Bobby; composed by Choice37 and Kush; and arranged by Choice37.

== Commercial performance ==
The song debuted at number three on South Korea Gaon Chart selling 167,705 copies and 3.2 million streams in five days. On May, and with two days the song charted 85 on the single chart, and 53 on the download chart with 116,862 downloads, and become the 9th most viewed K-Pop videos around the world. The following month the song charted 23 and sold 165,458 with 7.7 million streams. As of September 2016, the song sold 366,838 in South Korea.

In China the song charted 76 in QQ Music, in United States, it charted 6th on Billboard World Digital Songs, and become the group fifth top 10 songs on the chart.

== Charts ==
| Chart | Peak position |
|---|---|
| China (QQ Music Weekly Single Chart) | 76 |
| South Korea (Gaon Weekly Single Chart) | 3 |
| US World Digital Songs (Billboard) | 6 |

== Sales ==
| Chart | Sales |
|---|---|
| South Korean Gaon Download Chart | 366,838 |

== Release history ==
| Country | Release date | Format | Label | Ref. |
|---|---|---|---|---|
| Worldwide | May 30, 2016 | Digital download, streaming | YG Entertainment | |
