= Welcome Back (iKon album) =

- Full album cover

Studio album by iKon
- Released: December 24, 2015
- Recorded: 2015
- Studio: YG (Seoul)
- Genre: K-pop; hip hop; dance-pop
- Length: 40:24
- Language: Korean; Japanese
- Label: YG
- Producer: B.I

IKon chronology
| Welcome Back (2015) | WYD (2016) |

Singles from Welcome Back
- 1. "My Type" Released: September 15, 2015; 2. "Airplane" Released: October 1, 2015; 3. "Rhythm Ta" Released: October 1, 2015; 4. "Apology" Released: November 16, 2015; 5. "Anthem" Released: November 16, 2015; 6. "Dumb & Dumber" Released: December 24, 2015; 7. "What's Wrong?" Released: December 24, 2015

Half Album Cover

Welcome Back is the debut studio album by South Korean male group iKon. The full album was initially planned to be released on November 2, 2015. However, on October 27, 2015, YG Entertainment announced that the release of the full album would be delayed. The album was released on December 24, 2015, along with additional music videos than previously planned. Additionally, two digital singles along with accompanying music videos were released on November 16.

iKon topped the Gaon Album chart with their Debut Half Album - Welcome Back from October 4, 2015 to October 10, 2015. Their first single, My Type was released on September 15 and became a huge success, selling about 1.6 million copies in Korea and becoming one of the best selling singles of 2015.

== Background and development ==
On September 15, 2015, iKon's debut single "My Type" was released.

On October 1, 2015, iKon released the first half of Welcome Back, along with two music videos for their promotional singles "Airplane" and "Rhythm Ta." Two additional singles, "Apology" and "Anthem" were released on November 16, 2015, as part of the rescheduling of the release of the full album. iKon's first studio full album was released on December 24, 2015, with the title tracks "What's Wrong?" and "Dumb & Dumber".

iKon's leader B.I was involved in the song composition for the majority of the tracks in the full album.

== Commercial performance ==
Welcome Back Half Album charted at number one on the Gaon Album Chart selling 82,208 copies in its first month and 3,463 in the second month. The full album also charted at number one, with a total of 52,312 copies sold in the first month of release. In the year-end chart, the album reportedly sold a total of 117,483 copies.

On the Oricon Chart, the half album charted at 26 and the full album charted at 22. On January 13, 2016, the Japanese version of the album was released and 53,207 copies were sold in the first day, topping the Oricon daily chart. With a total of 61,508 copies sold in its first week of release, the Japanese album charted third on the Oricon chart. In October 2016, sales of the album had passed the 150,000 copies mark, and its Japanese version had passed the 90,000 copies mark.

"My Type" was released along with a music video on 15 September 2015. Within 24 hours of its release, the music video surpassed 1.7 million views on YouTube. The group took their first music show win with the single on 26 September 2015 on MBC's Music Core, even though they had yet to make their first official live appearance. On 24 September, "My Type" achieved a 'triple crown' on the Gaon chart, having taken the number one spot on the digital, download, and streaming charts simultaneously for the 39th week of 2015. On 18 September, the single became number one on the music video chart of Chinese music streaming sites QQ Music and Youku. iKon also trended on Weibo, where they were reportedly searched 1.3 billion times. "My Type" was the 34th best selling song of 2015 by Gaon Music chart.

== Track listing ==
Half album track list
| No. | Title | Lyrics | Music | Arrangement | Length |
|---|---|---|---|---|---|
| 1. | "Welcome Back" | B.I; Bobby | B.I; Rovin | Rovin | 3:33 |
| 2. | "Rhythm Ta" (리듬 타; Rhythm Ta) | B.I; Bobby | P.K; B.I; Ju-ne | P.K | 3:47 |
| 3. | "My Type" (취향저격; Chwihyangjeogyeok) | B.I; Bobby; Kush | Choice37; Kush; B.I | Choice37 | 3:31 |
| 4. | "Today" (오늘따라; Oneul Ttara) | B.I; Bobby | B.I; Ham Seung-cheon; Kang Uk-jin; Future Bounce | Future Bounce | 3:12 |
| 5. | "Airplane" | B.I; Bobby | B.I; Future Bounce | Future Bounce | 3:36 |
| 6. | "M.U.P" (솔직하게; Soljighage) | B.I; Bobby; The Jackie Boyz | B.I, The Fliptones; The Jackie Boyz | The Fliptones; The Jackie Boyz | 3:23 |
| Total length: | | | | | 21:02 |

Full album track list
| No. | Title | Lyrics | Music | Arrangement | Length |
|---|---|---|---|---|---|
| 1. | "Dumb & Dumber" (덤앤더머; deom-aendeomeo) | B.I; Bobby | Future Bounce; B.I | Future Bounce | 4:01 |
| 2. | "What's Wrong?" (왜 또; wae tto) | B.I; Bobby | B.I; Rovin | Rovin | 3:49 |
| 3. | "I Miss You So Bad" (아니라고; anilago) | G-Dragon; B.I; Bobby | G-Dragon; Dee.P | DEE.P | 3:48 |
| 4. | "Rhythm Ta" (리듬 타; lideum ta) | B.I; Bobby | P.K; B.I; Ju-ne | P.K | 3:47 |
| 5. | "Anthem" (이리오너라; Irioneora; B.I & Bobby) | B.I; Bobby | Teddy; B.I; Bobby | Teddy; Choice37 | 3:25 |
| 6. | "Apology" (지못미; Ji Mot-mi) | Teddy; Kush; B.I; Bobby | Teddy; Kush | Teddy; Kush | 3:51 |
| 7. | "Airplane" | B.I; Bobby | B.I; Future Bounce | Future Bounce | 3:36 |
| 8. | "My Type" (취향저격; Chwihyangjeogyeok) | B.I; Bobby; Kush | Choice37; Kush; B.I | Choice37 | 3:31 |
| 9. | "Today" (오늘따라; Oneul Ttara) | B.I; Bobby | B.I; Ham Seung-cheon; Kang Uk-jin; Future Bounce | Future Bounce | 3:12 |
| 10. | "Welcome Back" | B.I; Bobby | B.I; Rovin | Rovin | 3:33 |
| 11. | "Rhythm Ta Remix" (리듬 타; lideum ta) | B.I; Bobby | P.K; B.I; Ju-ne | P.K | 3:47 |
| Total length: | | | | | 41:00 |

DVD – disc 1 (Japanese complete edition)
| No. | Title | Length |
|---|---|---|
| 1. | "Dumb & Dumber" (Japanese ver.) |
| 2. | "What's Wrong?" (Japanese ver.) |
| 3. | "I Miss You So Bad" (Japanese ver.) |
| 4. | "Rhythm Ta" (Japanese ver.) |
| 5. | "Anthem" (CHOICE37 ver/Japanese ver.) |
| 6. | "Apology" (Japanese ver.) |
| 7. | "Airplane" (Japanese ver.) |
| 8. | "My Type" (Japanese ver.) |
| 9. | "Today" (Japanese ver.) |
| 10. | "Welcome Back" (Japanese ver.) |
| 11. | "Rhythm Ta" (Rock Ver./Japanese ver.) |
| 12. | "M.U.P" (Japanese ver.) |
| 13. | "Climax" (Japanese ver.) |
| 14. | "Just Another Boy" (Japanese ver.) |
| 15. | "Wait For Me" (Japanese ver.) |
| 16. | "Sinosijak" (Japanese ver.) |
| 17. | "Long Time No See" (Japanese ver.) |
| 18. | "Just Go" (Japanese ver.) |

DVD – disc 2 (Japanese complete edition)
| No. | Title | Length |
|---|---|---|
| 1. | "Dumb & Dumber" (Korean ver.) |
| 2. | "What's Wrong?" (Korean ver.) |
| 3. | "I Miss You So Bad" (Korean ver.) |
| 4. | "Rhythm Ta" (Korean ver.) |
| 5. | "Anthem" (CHOICE37 ver./Korean ver.) |
| 6. | "Apology" (Korean ver.) |
| 7. | "Airplane" (Korean ver.) |
| 8. | "My Type" (Korean ver.) |
| 9. | "Today" (Korean ver.) |
| 10. | "Welcome Back" (Korean ver.) |
| 11. | "Rhythm Ta" (Rock ver./Korean ver.) |
| 12. | "M.U.P" (Korean ver.) |
| 13. | "Climax" (Korean ver.) |
| 14. | "Just Another Boy" (Korean ver.) |
| 15. | "Wait For Me" (Korean ver.) |
| 16. | "Sinosijak" (Korean ver.) |
| 17. | "Long Time No See" (Korean ver.) |
| 18. | "Just Go" (Korean ver.) |

== Charts ==
Half Album

| Chart | Peak position |
|---|---|
| Japan Oricon Album Chart | 26 |
| South Korea Gaon Weekly Album Chart | 1 |
| South Korea Gaon Monthly Album Chart | 2 |
| US Billboard World Albums | 3 |
| Taiwanese Albums G-Music | 1 |

Full Album

| Chart | Peak position |
|---|---|
| Japan Oricon Album Chart | 3 |
| South Korea Gaon Album Chart | 1 |
| South Korea Gaon Monthly Album Chart | 5 |
| US Billboard Top Heatseekers | 23 |
| US Billboard World Albums | 2 |
| Taiwanese Albums G-Music | 1 |

== Sales ==
| Chart | Sales |
|---|---|
| South Korea | 157,255 |
| Japan | 99,570 |

== Awards ==
=== Music programs ===
| Song | Program | Date | Ref. |
|---|---|---|---|
| "My Type" | Show! Music Core (MBC) | September 26, 2015 | |
| "My Type" | Inkigayo (SBS) | September 27, 2015 | |
| "My Type" | Inkigayo (SBS) | October 4, 2015 | |
| "Rhythm Ta" | M Countdown (Mnet) | October 8, 2015 | |
| "Apology" | Inkigayo (SBS) | November 29, 2015 | |
| "Dumb & Dumber" | M Countdown (Mnet) | January 14, 2016 | |
| "Dumb & Dumber" | M Countdown (Mnet) | January 21, 2016 | |
| "Dumb & Dumber" | M Countdown (Mnet) | January 28, 2016 | |

== Release history ==
| Country | Date | Version | Language | Label(s) | Format | Ref. |
|---|---|---|---|---|---|---|
| South Korea | October 1, 2015 | EP | Korean | YG | Digital download; streaming | |
| Various | October 1, 2015 | EP | Korean | YG | Digital download; streaming | |
| South Korea | October 5, 2015 | EP | Korean | YG | CD | |
| Japan | October 28, 2015 | EP | Japanese | YGEX | Digital download; streaming | |
| South Korea | December 24, 2015 | Full Album | Korean | YG | CD | |
| Various | December 24, 2015 | Full Album | Korean | YG | Digital download; streaming | |
| Japan | January 13, 2016 | Full Album | Japanese | YGEX | Digital download; streaming | |
| Japan | March 30, 2016 | Complete Edition | Japanese | YGEX | CD; Digital download; streaming | |
