= Lee Hi discography =

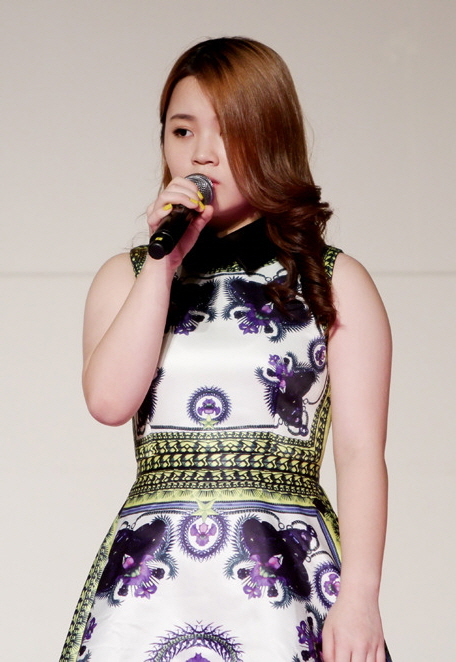
- Lee Hi performing at School of Performing Arts Seoul, on May 15, 2012
- Studio albums: 4
- EPs: 1
- Singles: 9

The discography of South Korean singer and songwriter Lee Hi consists of four studio albums, one extended play, and nine singles.

Lee Hi was the runner-up of SBS' K-pop Star Season 1. Her debut single "1.2.3.4", was released on October 28, 2012, and reached No. 1 with first-week sales of 667,549 downloads. On March 28, 2013, Lee Hi released her first album, which sold 17,309 copies and total 5,488,390 digital singles. Near the end of 2013, Lee Hi released a collaboration with Park Bom of 2NE1, a cover of Mariah Carey's single "All I Want for Christmas Is You". In 2014 she made a unit with Akdong Musician's Lee Suhyun and released "I'm Different", featuring Bobby of iKon. After three years from her first album, Lee Hi released a half album titled Seoulite digitally on March 9, 2016, including five songs. The full album Seoulite was released on April 20 and has 11 songs.

Lee Hi's third Korean studio album 4 Only was released on September 9, 2021.

== Albums ==
=== Studio albums ===
Title	Details	Peak chart positions			Sales
Title	Details	KOR	JPN	US World	Sales
First Love	Released: March 7, 2013 (Half); Label: YG Entertainment; Formats: CD, digital download	3	—	3	KOR: 19,436
First Love	Released: March 28, 2013 (Full); Label: YG Entertainment; Formats: CD, digital download	3	—	15	KOR: 19,436
Seoulite	Released: March 9, 2016 (Half); Label: YG Entertainment; Formats: CD, digital download	9	—	3	KOR: 8,356; US: 3,000
Seoulite	Released: April 20, 2016 (Full); Label: YG Entertainment; Formats: CD, digital download	9	—	—	KOR: 8,356; US: 3,000
Lee Hi Japan Debut Album	Released: March 21, 2018; Label: YGEX; Formats: CD, digital download	—	70	—	JPN: 1,183
4 Only	Released: September 9, 2021; Label: AOMG; Formats: CD, digital download	18	—	—	KOR: 8,315
"—" denotes items which were not released in that country or failed to chart

== Extended plays ==
List of extended plays, with selected chart positions and sales
Title	Details	Peak chart positions			Sales
Title	Details	KOR	FRA Digital	US World	Sales
24°C	Released: May 30, 2019; Label: YG Entertainment; Formats: CD, digital download	11	129	7	KOR: 5,285; US: 1,000

== Singles ==
=== As a lead artist ===
Title	Year	Peak chart positions					Sales	Album
Title	Year	KOR Circle	KOR Hot	MLY	NZ Hot	US World	Sales	Album
"1, 2, 3, 4" (원,투,쓰리,포)	2012	1	1	*	*	5	KOR: 2,339,809; US: 12,000	First Love
"Scarecrow" (허수아비)	2012	3	3	*	*	—	KOR: 980,606	First Love
"It's Over"	2013	3	4	*	*	13	KOR: 857,918	First Love
"Rose"	2013	1	1	*	*	4	KOR: 1,101,275	First Love
"Breathe" (한숨)	2016	2	*	*	*	22	KOR: 2,500,000	Seoulite
"Hold My Hand" (손잡아 줘요)	2016	8	*	*	*	—	KOR: 567,008	Seoulite
"My Star"	2016	9	*	*	*	—	KOR: 320,029	Seoulite
"No One" (누구 없소) (featuring B.I)	2019	2	4	17	33	6	US: 1,000	24 °C
"Holo" (홀로)	2020	7	6	13	39	—	—N/a	Non-album singles
"For You" (featuring Crush)	2020	45	40	—	—	—	—N/a	Non-album singles
"Only”	2021	93	56	1	—	—	—N/a	4 Only
"Red Lipstick" (빨간립스틱) (featuring Yoon Mi-rae)	2021	30	17	—	—	22	—N/a	4 Only
"Alley" (골목길) (featuring Sung Si-kyung)	2023	96	—	—	—	—	—N/a	Non-album singles
"My Beloved" (그대가 해준 말)	2024	163	—	—	—	—	—N/a	Non-album singles
"—" denotes releases that did not chart or were not released in that region.

=== As a featured artist ===
Title	Year	Peak positions		Sales	Album
Title	Year	KOR	KOR Hot	Sales	Album
"It's Cold" (Epik High featuring Lee Hi)	2012	1	1	KOR: 1,868,347	99
"Refrigerator" (Gill featuring Lee Hi and Verbal Jint)	2016	19	*	KOR: 142,995	Non-album single
"Like" (처럼) (Dok2 with Yoo Jae-suk featuring Lee Hi)	2016	7	*	KOR: 309,578	Infinite Challenge Great Heritage
"On & On" (Dok2 featuring Lee Hi)	2017	—	*	—N/a	Reborn
"X" (Code Kunst featuring Lee Hi)	2017	—	*	—N/a	Muggles' Mansion
"Here Come The Regrets" (Epik High featuring Lee Hi)	2017	12	19	KOR: 123,630	We've Done Something Wonderful
"XI" (Code Kunst featuring Lee Hi)	2019	—	—	—N/a	Non-album single
"Xii" (Code Kunst featuring Lee Hi)	2020	—	—	—N/a	People
"O" (Code Kunst featuring Lee Hi)	2020	—	—	—N/a	People
"Yours" (DJ Raiden, Exo's Chanyeol featuring Lee Hi, Changmo)	2020	49	53	—N/a	Non-album single
"Tip Toe" (Crush featuring Lee Hi)	2020	—	—	—N/a	With Her
"Villain" (악역) (Swings featuring Lee Hi, Simon Dominic)	2020	10	—	—N/a	Show Me the Money 9 Semi-final
"Call U Up" (Park Ji-hoon featuring Lee Hi)	2021	— (Note: "Call U Up" did not enter the Gaon Digital Chart, but peaked at number 17 and 98 on the Gaon Download chart and the Gaon BGM Chart, respectively.)	—	—N/a	Non-album single
"Bittersweet" (Seventeen's Wonwoo X Mingyu featuring Lee Hi)	2021	— (Note: "Bittersweet" did not enter the Gaon Digital Chart, but peaked at number 43 on the Gaon Download chart.)	—	—N/a	Non-album single
"Daydream" (긴 꿈) (B.I featuring Lee Hi)	2021	— (Note: "Daydream" did not enter the Gaon Digital Chart, but peaked at number 113 on the Gaon Download chart.)	—	—N/a	Waterfall
"Party for the Night" (Gray featuring Lee Hi, Loco)	2021	— (Note: "Party for the Night" did not enter the Gaon Digital Chart, but peaked at number 60 on the Gaon Download chart.)	—	—N/a	Grayground
"Rich Kids Anthem" (Epik High featuring Lee Hi)	2022	—	—	—N/a	Epik High Is Here 下 (Part 2)
'Off-Line" (Rad Museum featuring Dean and Lee Hi)	2022	—	—	—N/a	Rad
"Bye (안녕)" (Kim Oki featuring Lee Hi)	2022	—	—	—N/a	Greeting
"Alone" (Coogie featuring Lee Hi)	2022	—	—	—N/a	Alone
"Skit" (Slom featuring Lee Hi and Loco)	2022	—	—	—N/a	Weather Report
"Ondo" (Bronze featuring Lee Hi)	2022	—	—	—N/a	Skyline
"Home Boy" (Code Kunst featuring Lee Hi)	2023	—	—	—N/a	Remember Archive
"Do" (Padi featuring Lee Hi)	2023	—	—	—N/a	Answer Answer
Bad Habits (Crush featuring Lee Hi)	2023	—	—	—N/a	Wonderego
"Say Nothing" (Yugyeom featuring Lee Hi)	2024	—	—	—N/a	Trust Me and Lolo
"—" denotes releases that did not chart or were not released in that region.

=== Collaborations ===
Title	Year	Peak positions		Sales	Album
Title	Year	KOR	US World	Sales	Album
"All I Want for Christmas Is You" (with Park Bom)	2013	17	—	KOR: 115,674	Non-album single
"I'm Different" (나는 달라) (with Lee Suhyun featuring Bobby)	2014	1	3	KOR: 936,740	Seoulite
"Automatic Remix" (with various artist (Note: Chancellor, Jay Park, Bibi, Jamie, Moon, Bumkey, Samuel Seo, Suran, Babylon, Hoody, Sumin, Mrshll, Ann One, Elo, twlv, oceanfromtheblue, Jiselle, Sole, Thama, K.vsh, Jinbo, Jerd, Soovi, B.E.D., Xydo, Owell Mood, and None))	2020	—	—	—N/a	Non-album single

== Other charted songs ==
Title	Year	Peak positions		Sales	Album
Title	Year	KOR	KOR Hot	Sales	Album
"Special" (featuring Jennie of Blackpink)	2013	21	16	KOR: 206,840	First Love
"One-Sided Love" (짝사랑)	2013	27	21	KOR: 151,971	First Love
"Dream"	2013	44	35	KOR: 114,713	First Love
"Turn It Up (Intro)"	2013	64	—	KOR: 62,346	First Love
"Fool for Love" (바보)	2013	63	43	KOR: 59,464	First Love
"Because"	2013	80	56	KOR: 33,713	First Love
"Am I Strange" (내가 이상해)	2013	—	85	KOR: 27,630	First Love
"World Tour" (featuring Mino)	2016	14	*	KOR: 236,646	Seoulite
"Fxxk Wit Us" (featuring DOK2)	2016	19	*	KOR: 155,601	Seoulite
"Official" (featuring Incredivle)	2016	27	*	KOR: 119,707	Seoulite
"Video" (featuring Bobby)	2016	21	*	KOR: 160,960	Seoulite
"Blues" (희망고문)	2016	41	*	KOR: 103,591	Seoulite
"Up All Night" (밤샘) (featuring Tablo)	2016	42	*	KOR: 77,666	Seoulite
"Passing By" (스쳐 간다)	2016	59	*	KOR: 69,193	Seoulite
"Missing U"	2016	63	*	KOR: 64,678	Seoulite
"No Way" (featuring G.Soul)	2019	121	—	—N/a	24 °C
"Love Is Over"	2019	170	—	—N/a	24 °C
"1, 2" (한두 번) (featuring Choi Hyun-suk of Treasure)	2019	171	—	—N/a	24 °C
"Savior" (구원자) (featuring B.I)	2021	150	71	—N/a	4 Only
"H.S.K.T." (머리어깨무릎발) (featuring Wonstein)	2021	185	—	—N/a	4 Only
"—" denotes releases that did not chart or were not released in that region.

== Soundtrack appearances ==
Title	Year	Peak chart positions		Sales	Album
Title	Year	KOR	US World	Sales	Album
"Can You Hear My Heart" (내 마음 들리나요) (Epik High featuring Lee Hi)	2016	12	14	KOR: 254,899	Moon Lovers OST
"My Love" (내 사랑)	2016	19	22	KOR: 134,764	Moon Lovers OST
"Golden Slumbers"	2018	—	—	—N/a	Golden Slumber OST
"Brave Enough"	2020	186	—	—N/a	Record of Youth OST
"Dear You"	2021	—	—	—N/a	Romance 101 OST
"Hold My Hand" (손을 잡아줘요)	2021	62	—	—N/a	Now, We Are Breaking Up OST-Part 2
"We'll Shine Brighter Than Any Other Stars" (우린 어떠한 별보다 빛날 거야)	2022	88	—	—N/a	Soundtrack #1 OST
"Our Timeless Moments" (우린 어떠한 별보다 빛날 거야)	2024	— (Note: "Our Timeless Moments" did not enter the Circle Digital chart top 200, but appeared at number 16 on the component Download chart.)	—	—N/a	Dear Hyeri OST
"—" denotes releases that did not chart or were not released in that region.
