= I'm Different =

I'm Different may refer to:

- "I'm Different" (2 Chainz song), a song by American rapper 2 Chainz
- "I'm Different" (Hi Suhyun song), a song by South Korean duo Hi Suhyun
- "I'm Different", a song by Randy Newman from his 1983 album Trouble in Paradise
