= 4 Only =

Studio album by Lee Hi
- Released: September 9, 2021
- Studio: Koko Sound (Seoul)
- Genre: Synth-pop; jazz
- Length: 35:30
- Language: Korean
- Label: AOMG
- Producer: Lee Hi

Lee Hi chronology
24°C (2019)	4 Only (2021)

Singles from 4 Only
- 1. "Only" Released: August 27, 2021; 2. "Red Lipstick" Released: September 9, 2021

4 Only is the third Korean-language and fourth overall studio album by South Korean singer and songwriter Lee Hi, released on September 9, 2021, through AOMG. It is Lee's first studio album since Seoulite (2016), and first collection of new material since her 2019 EP 24°C and subsequent departure from YG Entertainment.

The single "Red Lipstick" featuring Yoon Mi-rae was released alongside the album on September 9. The album debuted at number 18 on the Gaon Album Chart in October 2021 following its physical release, selling over 8,000 copies in the last week of September.

== Music and lyrics ==
According to the description of the album, the protagonist of 4 Only encounters different types of love in each track. The emotions frequently change within each track, expressing such things as the purity of love, sorrow, joy, sadness, thrill, anger, regret, excitement, and desperation.

To embody the theme of expressing the various emotions of love, Lee Hi incorporates various music genres on the album, setting her voice against synth-pop and jazz melodies rather than the funky R&B soul of her previous songs. The Latin-style song "Intentions" emphasizes her husky voice while "Waterride" adds a rhythmic guitar performance in a fast tempo. "Savior", the third collaboration between Lee Hi and B.I, includes jazz sounds and poetic lyrics. "Red Lipstick" is a retro-style song that "drew inspiration from the South Korean R&B and hip-hop duo Tashannie."

== Singles ==
4 Only was preceded by the pre-release single "Only" on August 27, 2021, and was supported by the main single "Red Lipstick" featuring Yoon Mi-rae, released with the album on September 9.

The song "Savior" featuring B.I was scheduled to be released as the second pre-release single alongside "Only", but was delayed due to record production issues per a statement from AOMG. The music video for "Savior" was released on September 3, 2021, while the song was released on September 9, 2021, along with the rest of the album.

== Promotions ==
Lee Hi promoted "Red Lipstick" on M Countdown on September 9, Music Bank on September 10, Show! Music Core on September 11, and Inkigayo on September 12.

== Critical reception ==
Kim Seong-yeop of IZM rated 4 Only 2.5 out of 5 stars. According to Kim, the album is pleasing to the ear as it encompasses a wide musical range but no song seems to pack a punch, including the lead single "Red Lipstick" and "Safety Zone". He added that the album serves as a "turning point" where Lee Hi breaks the image YG Entertainment created for her and expresses her true identity.

Upon the release of the lead single "Only", Kim Seong-uk of IZM rated it 3 out of 5 stars. He stated that it shows off Lee's "refined singing" while giving off a "warm aura". He concluded that with the song, Lee and songwriter Ahn Shin-ae proved that they work well together.

Angela Suacillo of NME rated the album 5 out of 5 stars. She commented that "Although five years may feel like too long a wait for new music, Lee Hi makes it all worth it by producing a cohesive record that not only stays true to her roots, but one that allows her to explore genres that strengthen her identity as one of K-pop's strongest vocalists."

== Accolades ==
=== Awards and nominations ===
Awards and nominations for 4 Only
Award	Year	Category	Result	Ref.
Korean Hip-hop Awards	2022	R&B Album of the Year	Nominated	

=== Year-end lists ===
Appearances on critics' year-end lists for 4 Only
Critic/Publication	List	Work	Rank	Ref.
NME	The 25 Best Asian albums of 2021	4 Only	22	
Rolling Stone India	10 Best Korean Hip-Hop and R&B Albums of 2021	4 Only	10	
PopMatters	The 20 Best K-Pop Albums of 2021	4 Only	12	
The Ringer	The Best K-pop Songs of 2021	"Savior"	10	

== Track listing ==
4 Only track listing
No.	Title	Lyrics	Music	Arrangement	Length
1.	"Savior" (구원자; Guwonja; 'Atom'); featuring B.I))	B.I	B.I; Stally; Basecamp	Stally; Basecamp	3:35
2.	"Intentions" (그대의 의도; Geudaeui uido; 'Your righteousness')	Ahn Shin-ae	Ahn Shin-ae	Ahn Shin-ae; Lee Hi	3:24
3.	"Waterride" (물타기; Multagi)	Ahn Shin-ae	Ahn Shin-ae	Bronze	3:04
4.	"Bye"	Lee Hi	Lee Hi; Gray; Dax	Gray; Dax	3:10
5.	"Red Lipstick" (빨간 립스틱; Ppalgan ripseutik); (featuring Yoon Mi-rae)	Lee Hi; Chancellor; Yoon Mi-rae	Lee Hi; Chancellor; Purple; Cocona	Chancellor; Purple	3:07
6.	"H.S.K.T." (머리어깨무릎발; Meorieokkaemureupbal); (featuring Wonstein)	Lee Hi; Wonstein	Peejay; Lee Hi; Wonstein	Peejay	3:24
7.	"Safety Zone" (안전지대; Anjeonjidae)	Lee Hi	Lee Hi; Code Kunst	Code Kunst	4:08
8.	"What Is Love?" (어려워; Eoryeowo; 'It's difficult')	Lee Hi	Lee Hi; Code Kunst	Code Kunst	3:43
9.	"Darling"	Lee Hi	Lee Hi; Bronze	Bronze	3:55
10.	"Only"	Ahn Shin-ae	Ahn Shin-ae	Philtre	4:00
Total length:					35:30

== Charts ==
Chart performance for 4 Only
Chart (2021)	Peak position
South Korean Albums (Gaon)	18

== Sales ==
Sales of 4 Only
Region	Sales
South Korea	8,315
