= Only (Lee Hi song) =

2021 single by Lee Hi

Single by Lee Hi

from the album 4 Only
- Language: Korean
- Released: August 27, 2021
- Recorded: 2021
- Genre: K-pop; R&B; ballad
- Length: 4:00
- Label: AOMG
- Songwriter: Ahn Shin-ae
- Producer: Ahn Shin-ae

Lee Hi singles chronology
"For You" (2020)	"Only" (2021)	"Red Lipstick" (2021)

Music video
- "Only" on YouTube

"Only" is a song recorded by South Korean singer and songwriter Lee Hi. It was released on August 27, 2021, through AOMG, as the first pre-release single from her third Korean-language and fourth overall studio album, 4 Only. The song was written and composed by Ahn Shin-ae and arranged by Philtre.

== Background and release ==
Following the release of her EP 24°C in 2019, which marked her final release under YG Entertainment, Lee Hi departed the label later that year and subsequently signed with AOMG in July 2020. Under AOMG, she released the digital single “Holo” and later collaborated with South Korean singer Crush on "For You", signaling a new artistic direction and a more frequent release schedule. In August 2021, AOMG officially announced Lee Hi’s third Korean-language and fourth overall studio album, 4 Only, through the label’s official Instagram account, confirming the return of the singer with a full-length project under AOMG. On August 23, 2021, a teaser video was released via AOMG’s official YouTube channel, revealing the album’s title and concept while signaling the start of the promotional campaign for the forthcoming release. The song was released digitally on August 27, 2021, alongside its accompanying music video, ahead of the full album release.

== Composition ==
“Only” was written and composed by Ahn Shin-ae and arranged by Philtre. Musically, the song is a mid-tempo R&B ballad built around a minimalist production that emphasizes emotional restraint and vocal clarity. Critics described the track as being driven primarily by soft piano instrumentation, subdued percussion, and ambient textures, creating an intimate soundscape that places Lee’s vocals at the center of the arrangement. The song’s structure avoids dramatic dynamic shifts, instead favoring a smooth progression between verses and chorus. Reviewers noted that the arrangement relies heavily on negative space and muted instrumentation, allowing emotional nuance to guide the song’s momentum rather than a conventional build-and-drop format. Lyrically, “Only” conveys themes of unconditional devotion, vulnerability, and emotional sincerity, expressed through simple and direct phrasing. Commentators interpreted the song as a reflection of emotional maturity, aligning with the broader tone of 4 Only, which was widely described as cohesive, introspective, and understated in its approach to contemporary R&B.

== Music video ==
=== Background ===
The accompanying music video for “Only” was directed by Han Sa-min and was released on August 27, 2021, to coincide with the song’s digital release. The video stars South Korean actors Lee Je-hoon and Won Jin-ah, marking a high-profile collaboration that drew attention to the single upon release. The music video was positioned as a central visual element of the promotional roll-out for 4 Only.

=== Synopsis and reception ===
The music video depicts a romance unfolding across time, following a couple portrayed in their youth by Lee Je-hoon and Won Jin-ah, and in their later years by Nam Myeong-ryeol and Moon Sook. Rather than presenting a linear plot, the video moves through vignettes of their relationship, juxtaposing intimate moments from earlier in life with images of the couple as elderly, emphasizing love’s endurance over time. In a review of the release, Emerging Sentiments described the video as “movie-like” and centered on a couple “flitting through time,” while also suggesting that an underlying tragedy may be implied beneath the romantic imagery. Separately, Allkpop characterized the music video as telling “a love story through time,” reinforcing the song’s reflective tone through its inter-generational framing. As of 2025, the music video has accumulated over 200 million views on YouTube.

== Critical reception ==
“Only” received generally positive reviews from music critics, who praised its emotional restraint and Lee Hi’s vocal performance. In a review of 4 Only, NME described the song as emblematic of the album’s understated R&B approach, highlighting its simplicity and emotional clarity. Seoul Therapy noted that “Only” stands out for its intimacy and minimal arrangement, emphasizing how the track allows Lee Hi’s vocals to convey vulnerability without excessive production. Writing for Emerging Sentiments, the reviewer described “Only” as emotionally sincere and central to the album’s thematic focus on love and personal reflection. Additional commentary from Allkpop highlighted the song’s subdued tone and narrative cohesion with its music video, noting that both elements contribute to the album’s consistent and introspective mood.

== Accolades ==
=== Awards ===
Awards and nominations for "Only"
Year	Organization	Award	Result	Ref.
2022	Korean Hip-hop Awards	R&B Track of the Year	Won	

== Commercial performance ==
In South Korea, “Only” debuted on the Gaon Digital Chart during the chart week of September 5–11, 2021, where it peaked at number 93. The song also entered the Billboard K-Pop Hot 100, debuting and peaking at number 56, marking Lee Hi’s return to the chart following the release of her album 4 Only. Internationally, “Only” achieved notable success in Malaysia, where it reached number one on the Recording Industry Association of Malaysia (RIM) Top 20 Most Streamed International & Domestic Singles chart for the week of September 17–23, 2021.

== Credits and personnel ==
Credits adapted from the liner notes of 4 Only.

Personnel

- Lee Hi – vocals, background vocals
- Ahn Shin-ae – lyrics, composition
- Philtre – arrangement

== Charts ==
Chart (2021)	Peak position
Malaysia (RIM)	1
South Korea (Gaon)	93
South Korea (Kpop Hot 100)	56

== See also ==
- Lee Hi discography

== Release history ==
Region	Date	Format	Label
Various	August 27, 2021	Digital download, streaming	AOMG
