= Crumple (album) =

Studio album by Code Kunst
- Released: April 28, 2015
- Genre: Hip hop
- Length: 1:08:00

Code Kunst chronology
Novel (2014)	Crumple (2015)	Muggles' Mansion (2017)

Singles from Crumple
- 1. "Edison" Released: January 21, 2015; 2. "Golden Cow" Released: March 10, 2015

Crumple is the second studio album of South Korean music producer Code Kunst. It was self-released on April 28, 2015. It was later nominated for Best Rap Album at the Korean Music Awards and peaked at number 34 on the Gaon Album Chart.

== Background ==
In an interview with BNT, Code Kunst explained why he named the album Crumple.

People's faces usually crumple when they really appreciate music or movies. I got inspiration from that. It is a form of admiration that is shown on the face.

== Music and lyrics ==
Code Kunst creates a dreamy atmosphere by using various synth sounds on top of a rhythm with thick texture. While his signature technique of combining noise and vocal sources is used, variations in beats such as the second half of "Dig!" and "What I Feel" stand out. Meanwhile, the featuring artists share their stories by rapping tightly as if they were competing with each other.

"Golden Cow" depicts the past and present of C Jamm and Code Kunst. "Edison" bodies out the image of experimenting in a laboratory through variations in the hook and bridge. "Love Scene" is the suicide note of a "pathetic" Asian man who fell in love with a beautiful white woman but got beaten up by her boyfriend. It reinterprets the texture and mood of hip hop drums in Britpop style.

== Critical reception ==
Lee Jin-seok of Rhythmer rated the album 4 out of 5 stars. According to him, it is evident that Code Kunst paid close attention to the texture and sound of each track and the instrument and sound sources are well harmonized.

Critics of Music Y rated "Address" 4 out of 5 stars. According to Kim Jeong-won, it reflects Hwaji's concern about how to tell his story and reveals Code Kunst's ability to bring it forth.

=== Year-end lists ===
Publication	List	Rank	Ref.
Rhythmer	10 Best Korean Rap Albums of 2015	5	

== Awards and nominations ==
Award	Year	Category	Result	Ref.
Korean Music Awards	2016	Best Rap Album	Nominated	

== Track listing ==
No.	Title	Length
1.	"Rap Concert" (featuring Wutan)	3:12
2.	"Golden Cow" (featuring C Jamm & DJ SQ)	4:42
3.	"Good Bye Novel"	2:21
4.	"Edison" (에디슨) (featuring Nucksal)	3:38
5.	"Dig!" (featuring Ja Mezz)	4:07
6.	"Queen" (featuring Blnk)	3:12
7.	"My Rules" (나만의 룰) (featuring Giriboy & Ugly Duck)	4:28
8.	"Directors" (featuring Don Mills, Geegooin & Hangzoo)	4:15
9.	"Correct" (그렇다고) (featuring Paloalto)	3:13
10.	"1218"	2:40
11.	"What I Feel" (featuring Donutman & Owen)	4:28
12.	"The City of the Blind" (눈먼 자들의 도시) (featuring Nucksal)	3:42
13.	"Love Scene" (featuring Car, the Garden)	3:41
14.	"Mido" (미도) (featuring Blnk, Bassagong, Jayho)	4:19
15.	"Dope"	0:47
16.	"Life is Crazy" (featuring New Champ)	4:30
17.	"Address" (주소) (featuring Hwaji)	4:29
18.	"Thank You & Fuck You"	1:17
19.	"Overdose" (featuring Rosemi)	3:53
20.	"Bottle Cap" (병뚜껑)	1:27
Total length:		1:08:00

== Charts ==
Chart (2017)	Peak position
South Korean Albums (Gaon)	34

== Sales ==
Region	Sales
South Korea	864
