= Raiden (DJ) =

South Korean DJ and record producer (born 1987)

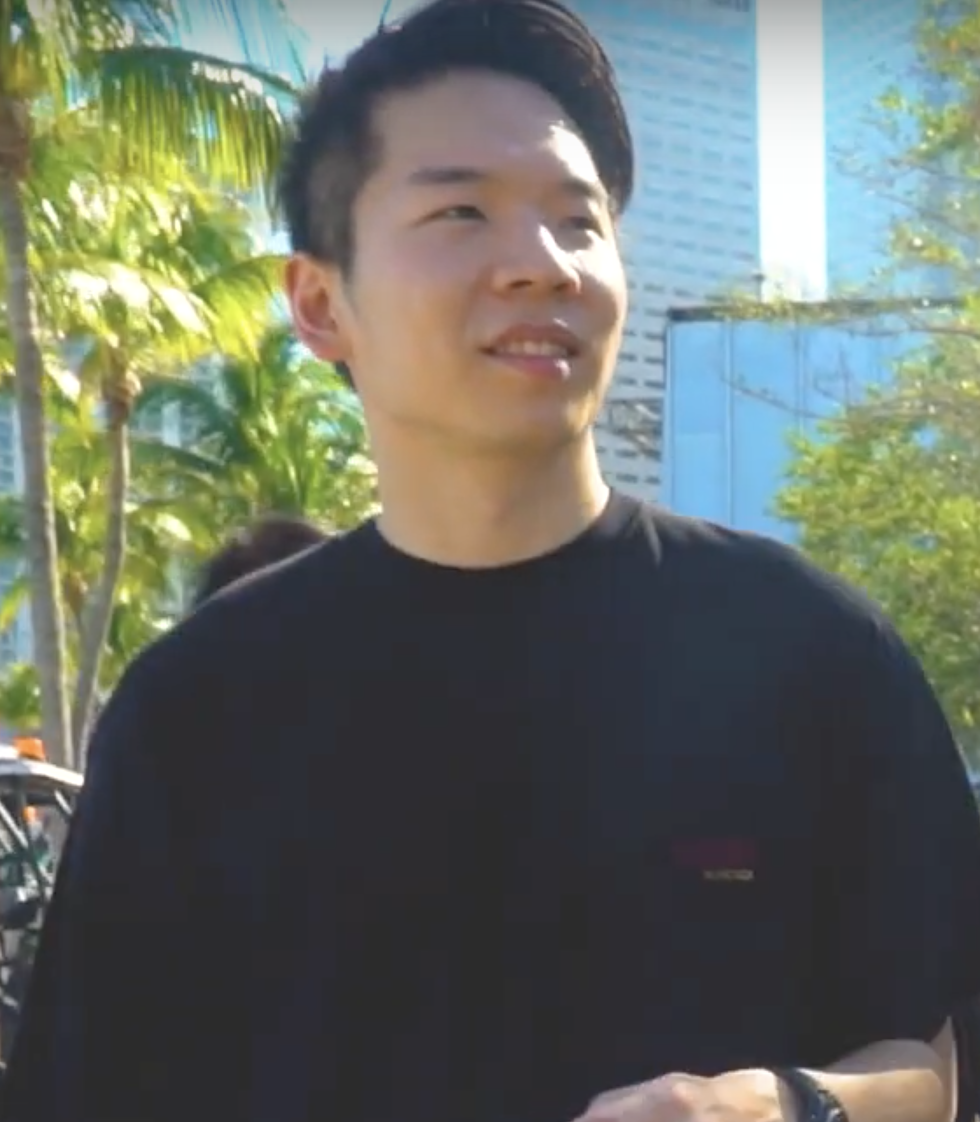
- Raiden in 2018
- Born: Han Seok-hyun; February 6, 1987 (age 39)
- Education: Shobi University
- Occupations: DJ; record producer
- Years active: 2013–present
- Musical career
- Genres: EDM; house
- Labels: SM (ScreaM); Darklight; Protocol; Stmpd
- Website: Official Website

Korean name
- Hangul: 한석현
- RR: Han Seokhyeon
- MR: Han Sŏkhyŏn

Han Seok-hyun (Korean: 한석현; born February 6, 1987), known professionally as Raiden (레이든), is a South Korean DJ and record producer signed under SM Entertainment.

== Life and career ==
=== 1987–2018: Early life, education, and career beginnings ===
Han Seok-hyun bought a guitar when he was still in middle school. Since he liked music, he decided to pursue it as his career and play with the guitar. Han's parents disapproved of the idea of pursuing it but gave permission when he became a high school student. During a high school festival, he established a band and presented on stage. Because there was no band club at Sehwa High School where he graduated, he made one with his senior students and performed on stage.

In an interview with the Korea Times, Raiden wanted to study in Japan since he was a child; hence he got into Shobi University in 2005 studying guitar while being a rocker and lived there for six years. In 2011, he returned to South Korea and started his band, but realized that living there while being a rocker was hard. Through a high school colleague who studied music with Han, he learned to use turntables and altered his career to a DJ. He revealed that he got "loss in the beginning" as he did not professionally learn to play a turntable and just listened to music from numerous DJs. In three months, he learned to handle the turntable at the Double Eight Club in Sinsa-dong, Seoul, embarking on his music festival debut and as the main DJ at the Ultra Music Festival (UMF) in 2013.

The single "Heart of Steel", inspired by Raiden's 2014 European tour while watching the sunrise in Spain, was released after two years of transformation from progressive house to future bass. Formerly, the song debuted at Ultra Korea 2015 and was re-released as Raiden's new song on January 13, 2017, featuring Bright Lights.

On January 26, 2018, Raiden released collaboration single with Girls' Generation's Yuri titled "Always Find You" through SM Station. In February 2018, Raiden performed as Korea's representative DJ and producer on the closing ceremony of the 2018 Pyeongchang Winter Olympics. In March 2018, Raiden, along with Yuri, was confirmed to perform "Always Find You" on the main stage at Ultra Miami 2018 held in Miami, Florida, USA on March 23.

=== 2019–present: Signing with SM Entertainment, Love Right Back ===
On June 14, 2019, Raiden, along with Thomas Gold, released a progressive house single, "Someone New", delivering a "mint combination of soulful vocals, bouncy basslines, and uplifting melodies". Upon signing a contract with SM Entertainment, he released his new single, "The Only", on August 2, 2019. It was described as an electronic pop song produced by himself, featuring Red Velvet member Irene.

On May 12, 2020, Raiden's bright synth-pop, "Yours", was released along with EXO member, Chanyeol featuring Lee Hi and Changmo. Raiden says the song's release was relevant in the current time of COVID-19 concerns and social distancing; therefore, he "wanted to present the feeling of love and care for each other" as a message. Through SM Station, a pop genre song, "Think About Me", the collaboration single with Girls' Generation member, Hyo featuring Coogie, was released on October 30. The music video featured the three artists attending the Protocol Labelnight performance during the Amsterdam Dance Event (ADE) in the Netherlands in 2019. DJ Mag indexed Raiden on its DJ Mag Top 100 DJs: The Next 50 list in 2019 in which 50 artists who failed to place on the main DJ Mag Top 100 DJs poll were included, ranking in the 44th place and 144th overall.

On January 1, 2021, Raiden and other SM Entertainment artists performed at the SMTOWN Live Culture Humanity concert. Along with Ginjo and Imlay, he presented EDM performances with a remix setlist of songs by various SM artists as they completed the stage of a "true" music festival. "Runner" was composed for the League of Legends 2021 and T1's theme song, also for the team's entry song on the League of Legends Champions Korea (LCK). The single with a combination of rock, trap, and EDM genres was released on January 26, with the production of Raiden, EXO's Baekhyun, and Changmo. On July 6, "In Ruin", an alternative rock genre song composed by Raiden for the original soundtrack of You Are My Spring, sung by American singer-songwriter Nino Lucarelli was released. On October 11, Raiden released his first EP, Love Right Back, which contains five tracks including the lead single of the same name.

On October 27, 2023, Raiden featuring singer-songwriter and producer August Rigo released single, "Take Me Back", through Protocol Recordings.

== Discography ==
=== Extended plays ===
List of extended plays, showing selected details and selected chart positions
Title	Details	Peak chart positions
Title	Details	KOR
Love Right Back	Released: October 11, 2021; Label: SM, ScreaM, Dreamus; Formats: CD, digital download, streaming; Track listing: 1. Love Right Back (featuring Taeil and lIlBOI); 2. Side Effect (featuring Miyeon); 3. Golden (featuring Xiaojun and pH-1); 4. It Wasn't Me (featuring Choi Yoo-jung); 5. Karma (featuring Nino Lucarelli)	83

=== Charted singles ===
List of charted singles, showing year released, selected chart positions, and name of the album
Title	Year	Peak chart positions			Album
Title	Year	KOR		US World	Album
Title	Year	Gaon	Hot	US World	Album
As lead artist
"Love Right Back" (featuring Taeil and lIlBOI)	2021	— (Note: "Love Right Back" did not enter the Gaon Digital Chart, but peaked at position 83 on the component Download Chart.)	—	—	Love Right Back
Collaborations
"Yours" (with Chanyeol featuring Lee Hi and Changmo)	2020	49	53	8	Non-album single
Promotional singles
"Runner" (with T1, Baekhyun, and Changmo)	2021	124	—	—	Non-album single
Soundtrack appearances
"Home" (with Big Naughty and Exy)	2021	— (Note: "Home" did not enter the Gaon Digital Chart, but peaked at position 141 on the component Download Chart.)	—	—	Idol: The Coup
"—" denotes releases that did not chart or were not released in that region.

=== Other singles ===
List of other singles, showing year released, and name of the album
Title	Year	Album	Ref.
As lead artist
"Heart of Steel" (featuring Bright Lights)	2017	Non-album single	
"Acid Love"	2017	Protocol Lab - ADE 2017, Pt. 2	
"Punjo"	2018	Non-album singles	
"Glory"	2018	Non-album singles	
"The Only" (featuring Irene)	2019	Non-album singles	
Collaborations
"Hanabi" (with Florian Picasso)	2017	Non-album singles	
"C'est La Vibe" (with Tom Tyger)	2017	Non-album singles	
"Always Find You" (with Yuri)	2018	Non-album singles	
"Keep My Light On" (with DubVision)	2018	Non-album singles	
"Hit the Club" (with Fedde Le Grand)	2018	Non-album singles	
"Light Me Up" (with Matisse & Sadko)	2018	Non-album singles	
"Yesterday" (with DubVision)	2018	Non-album singles	
"Electric" (with Tom Tyger)	2018	Non-album singles	
"Someone New" (with Thomas Gold)	2019	Non-album singles	
"Think About Me" (with Hyo featuring Coogie)	2020	Non-album singles	
"Am I" (with Deniz Koyu)	2021	Non-album singles	
"In Ruin"	2021	You Are My Spring	
"Me Without Us" (with Matisse & Sadko featuring Justin Jesso)	2022	Non-album singles	
"Last Man Standing" (with The Boyz)	2022	Non-album singles	

=== Production credits ===
All song credits are adapted from the Korea Music Copyright Association's database.

List of credited songs, year released, artists, and name of the album
Title	Year	Artist(s)	Album	Lyrics	Composition	Arrangement
"Heart of Steel"	2017	Raiden, Bright Lights	Non-album singles	No	Yes	No
"Always Find You"	2018	Raiden, Yuri	Non-album singles	Yes	Yes	No
"Always Find You (Korean Version)"	2018	Raiden, Yuri	Non-album singles	Yes	Yes	No
"Punjo"	2018	Raiden	Non-album singles	Yes	Yes	Yes
"Hit the Club"	2018	Fedde Le Grand, Raiden	Non-album singles	Yes	Yes	Yes
"Glory"	2018	Raiden	Non-album singles	No	Yes	Yes
"The Only"	2019	Raiden, Irene	Non-album singles	Yes	Yes	No
"Yours"	2020	Raiden, Chanyeol, Lee Hi, Changmo	Non-album singles	Yes	Yes	No
"Think About Me"	2020	Raiden, Hyo, Coogie	Non-album singles	No	Yes	No
"Runner"	2021	T1, Raiden, Baekhyun, Changmo	Non-album singles	No	Yes	Yes
"In Ruin"	2021	Raiden	You Are My Spring	No	Yes	Yes
"Side Effect"	2021	Raiden, Miyeon	Love Right Back	Yes	Yes	No
"Golden"	2021	Raiden, Xiaojun, pH-1	Love Right Back	No	Yes	No
"It Wasn't Me"	2021	Raiden, Choi Yoo-jung	Love Right Back	No	Yes	No
"Karma"	2021	Raiden, Nino Lucarelli	Love Right Back	Yes	Yes	No
"Home"	2022	Big Naughty, Exy, Raiden	Idol: The Coup	No	Yes	No
"Te Amo"	2022	Miyeon	My	No	Yes	Yes

== Filmography ==
List of television series title, year released, role, and notes
Year	Title	Role	Notes	Ref.
2022	Idol: The Coup	Himself	Cameo (Episode 1)	

== Concerts ==
Concert participation

- SM Town Live "Culture Humanity" (2021)
- SM Town Live 2022: SMCU Express at Kwangya (2022)
- SM Town Live 2023: SMCU Palace at Kwangya (2023)
