= Sailing (album) =

Studio album by AKMU
- Released: September 25, 2019
- Recorded: 2019
- Genre: K-pop
- Length: 34:55
- Language: Korean
- Label: YG
- Producer: Lee Chan-hyuk

AKMU chronology
Summer Episode (2017)	Sailing (2019)	AKMU 'Sailing' Tour Live (2020)

Singles from Sailing
- 1. "How Can I Love the Heartbreak, You're the One I Love" Released: September 25, 2019

Sailing (Korean: 항해; RR: Hanghae) is the third studio album by South Korean brother-sister duo AKMU. It was released on September 25, 2019, through YG Entertainment. All the tracks' lyrics and music were written by member Lee Chan-hyuk. The album was supported by the single "How Can I Love the Heartbreak, You're the One I Love", which reached atop on the Gaon Digital Chart and Billboard's K-pop Hot 100. Sailing received generally positive reviews from music critics, many of whom complimented AKMU's stylistic shift from their previous releases to more musical maturity.

== Background ==
In September 2017, AKMU member–Lee Chan-hyuk–went on hiatus to enlist for his obligatory military service; he was discharged in May 2019. On September 5, 2019, AKMU's agency YG Entertainment released a poster notifying their comeback in two years and two months, since Summer Episode in July 2017. Next day, disclosing a teaser video, YG Entertainment announced the release of AKMU's third full-length album, titled Sailing. On September 9, YG Entertainment informed that the album would be released on 25th, and unveiled a teaser poster.

== Critical reception ==
Professional ratings
Review scores
Source	Rating
IZM	4/5 stars

In an article for Korea JoongAng Daily, Kim Eun-jin wrote that AKMU "takes a sharp turn from the bright and bubbly tones that characterized their earlier music. ... With lyrics that discuss topics like freedom expressed through sentimental melodies and acoustic sounds, Sailing is an album that reflects the depth and maturity." In the album review, IZM's Park Soo-jin gave a four-star rating out of five, and said that "this album backslashes genres and expresses them without boundaries," and concluded by writing that Sailing "will be the pinnacle of broadening AKMU's spectrum." Tamar Herman of Billboard said that the "album features songs that show the pair's artistic development, exploring a variety of new genres all the while still incorporating their distinctly vibrant, soulful folk-pop sound." The publication additionally ranked "How Can I Love the Heartbreak, You're the One I Love" number 7 in their list of 25 Best K-pop Songs of 2019.

== Accolades ==
Awards and nominations
Year	Awards ceremony	Category	Nominee	Result
2019	11th Melon Music Awards	Best Rock Track	"Freedom"	Nominated
2019	21st Mnet Asian Music Awards	Best Vocal Performance – Group	"How Can I Love the Heartbreak, You're the One I Love"	Nominated
2020	34th Golden Disc Awards	Digital Daesang	"How Can I Love the Heartbreak, You're the One I Love"	Nominated
2020	34th Golden Disc Awards	Digital Bonsang	"How Can I Love the Heartbreak, You're the One I Love"	Won
2020	9th Gaon Chart Music Awards	Song of the Year – September	"How Can I Love the Heartbreak, You're the One I Love"	Won
2020	17th Korean Music Awards	Song of the Year	"How Can I Love the Heartbreak, You're the One I Love"	Nominated
2020	17th Korean Music Awards	Best Pop Song	"How Can I Love the Heartbreak, You're the One I Love"	Nominated
2020	17th Korean Music Awards	Best Pop Album	Sailing	Nominated

Music program wins
Song	Program	Date	Ref.
"How Can I Love the Heartbreak, You're the One I Love"	Inkigayo (SBS)	October 20, 2019	
"How Can I Love the Heartbreak, You're the One I Love"	Inkigayo (SBS)	October 27, 2019	
"How Can I Love the Heartbreak, You're the One I Love"	Music Bank (KBS)	October 21, 2019	
"How Can I Love the Heartbreak, You're the One I Love"	Show! Music Core (MBC)	October 26, 2019	

== Track listing ==
All tracks are written by Lee Chan-hyuk.

No.	Title	Arrangement	Length
1.	"Chantey" (뱃노래; Baennorae)	Jukjae	2:18
2.	"Fish In The Water" (물 만난 물고기; Mul mannan mulgogi)	Choi Ye-geun	3:36
3.	"How Can I Love the Heartbreak, You're the One I Love" (어떻게 이별까지 사랑하겠어, 널 사랑하는 거지; Eotteoke ibyeolkkaji saranghagesseo, neol saranghaneun geoji)	Lee Hyun-young	4:50
4.	"Moon" (달; Dal)	Jukjae	4:02
5.	"Freedom"	Lee Hyun-young	3:33
6.	"Should've Loved You More" (더 사랑해줄걸; Deo saranghaejulgeol)	Choi Ye-geun	3:07
7.	"Whale" (고래; Gorae)	Jukjae	3:19
8.	"Endless Dream, Good Night" (밤 끝없는 밤; Bam kkeudeomneun bam)	Denis Seo; Shin Seung-ik	3:00
9.	"Farewell" (작별 인사; Jakbyeol insa)	Lee Su-hyun	3:28
10.	"Let's Take Time" (시간을 갖자; Siganeul gatja)	Hong So-jin	3:42
Total length:			34:55

== Charts ==
Weekly chart performance for Sailing
Chart (2019)	Peak position
South Korean Albums (Gaon)	4

Weekly chart performance for Sailing (LP)
Chart (2021)	Peak position
South Korean Albums (Gaon)	43

Monthly chart performance for Sailing
Chart (2019)	Peak position
South Korean Albums (Gaon)	26

== Sales ==
Sales for Sailing
Region	Sales
South Korea (Gaon) (Note: Sales figure as of October 2019.)	10,531

== Release history ==
Region	Date	Format	Label
Various	September 25, 2019	CD; digital download; streaming	YG
South Korea	October 8, 2021	LP	YG
