= No One (Lee Hi song) =

2019 single by Lee Hi featuring B.I

Single by Lee Hi featuring B.I of iKon

from the EP 24°C
- Language: Korean; English
- Released: May 30, 2019
- Recorded: 2018–2019
- Genre: K-pop; R&B; reggae-pop
- Length: 3:15
- Label: YG
- Songwriters: Yoon Myung Woon; Kim Min Gu; Kim Han Bin
- Producers: Yoon Myung Woon; Kim Min Gu

Lee Hi singles chronology
"My Star" (2016)	"No One" (2019)	"Yours" (2020)

B.I singles chronology
"Anthem" (2015)	"No One" (2019)	"Midnight Blue" (2021)

Music video
- "No One" on YouTube

"No One" (stylized in all caps, Korean: 누구없소; RR: Nugu Eopso) is a song recorded by South Korean singer and songwriter Lee Hi featuring B.I of iKon from Lee's first EP 24°C. It was released on May 30, 2019, by YG as the lead single from the EP. It is Lee's first single (as the lead artist) since her three-year hiatus following the release of her second studio album in 2016.

== Background and composition ==
The single and EP were announced on May 20. It was written by Yoon Myung Woon, Kim Min Gu, and iKON’s B.I. No One tells a story about the person who's lonely and wants to be with someone.

== Critical reception ==
"No One" has been described as a reggaeton-infused, dance track with a groovy tune full of vibrant percussion, smooth melodies, and quirky synths.

== Track listing ==
- Digital download and streaming
1. "No One (누구없소)" – 3:15

== Music video ==
The music video teaser was released on May 27, 2019. The official music video was released on May 30, 2019. As of October 2026, it has over 74 million views on YouTube and 68 million streams on Spotify.

== Accolades ==
=== Music program awards ===
Program	Date	Ref.
Inkigayo (SBS)	June 16, 2019	

== Charts ==
=== Weekly charts ===
Chart (2019)	Peak position
Malaysia (RIM)	17
New Zealand Hot Singles (RMNZ)	33
South Korea (Gaon)	2
South Korea (Kpop Hot 100)	4
US World Digital Song Sales (Billboard)	6

=== Year-end chart ===
Chart (2019)	Peak position
South Korea (Gaon)	100

== See also ==
- List of Inkigayo Chart winners (2019)
- Lee Hi discography
- List of M Countdown Chart winners (2019)

== Release history ==
Region	Date	Format	Label
Various	May 30, 2019	Digital download, streaming	YG
