= Shobi University =

Coordinates: 35.90745°N 139.45943°E

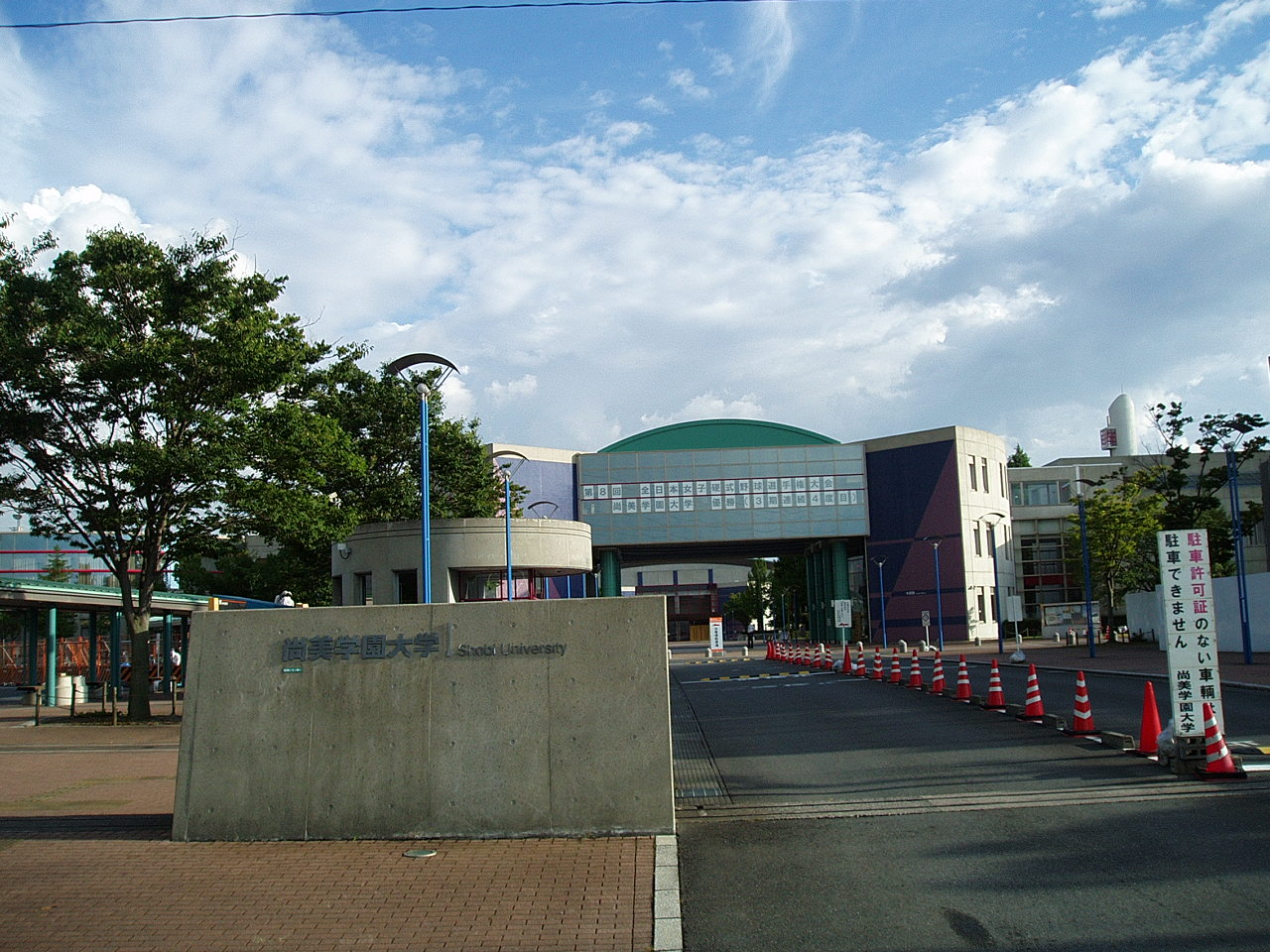
Kawagoe Campus

Shobi University (尚美学園大学, Shōbi gakuen daigaku) is a private university in Kawagoe, Saitama, Japan, established in 2000. The predecessor of the school was founded in 1926.

== Alumni ==
- Mai Hoshimura, musician
- Raiden, South Korean DJ
- Kyoko Yamamoto, Director of Music at Burlingame High School
