= Yours (Raiden and Chanyeol song) =

Single by Raiden x Chanyeol, featuring Lee Hi and Changmo
- Language: Korean
- Released: May 12, 2020
- Recorded: 2020
- Genre: Synth-pop; Electro funk; Nu-disco; R&B
- Length: 3:57
- Label: SM; ScreaM; Genie
- Composers: Rob Adans; Han Seok-hyun; Ku Chang-mo; Benjamin Samama
- Lyricists: Lee Jae-kwang (Makeumine Works); Lee Ji-won; Ku Chang-mo
- Producer: Han Seok-hyun

Raiden singles chronology
"The Only" (2019)	"Yours" (2020)	"Think About Me" (2020)

Chanyeol singles chronology
"Go Away Go Away" (2020)	"Yours" (2020)	"Anbu" (2020)

Lee Hi singles chronology
"No One" (2019)	"Yours" (2020)	"Holo" (2020)

Changmo singles chronology
"Meteor" (2019)	"Yours" (2020)	"Countin My Guap" (2020)

Music video
- "Yours" on YouTube

"Yours" is a single released by South Korean DJ and record producer Raiden (Note: Credited as Raiden featuring Chanyeol, Lee Hi, and Changmo in some streaming platforms.) and South Korean rapper Chanyeol featuring South Korean singer and songwriter Lee Hi and fellow South Korean rapper and music producer Changmo. It was released digitally on May 12, 2020, by SM Entertainment and its EDM label, ScreaM Records, and distributed by Genie Music. The lyrics of the song was written by Lee Jae-kwang (JQ), Lee Ji-won, and Changmo. The song was composed by Raiden, Rob Adans, and Benjamin Samama, and arranged solely by Raiden.

== Background and release ==
On May 7, 2020 SM Entertainment announced that its artists DJ Raiden and Chanyeol of boy band Exo would team up for a single called "Yours", which will feature Lee Hi and Changmo. The following day on May 8, the agency uploaded teaser images of Raiden and Chanyeol. On May 11, SM uploaded two different teasers on YouTube; the first one shows Raiden playing organ, while Chanyeol sets up a camera. The second teaser meanwhile, revealed more of the song as Chanyeol sang its chorus by the window, while Raiden plays the organ and an electric guitar.

... previously, I was more focused on my career as a DJ and producer in the dance/electronic music scene, but this song was everything I had dreamed of – being able to collaborate with brilliant musicians from many musical genres to make wonderful music.

— Raiden on the vision of the song, three years before its release.

On May 12 the single was digitally released alongside its music video. A day later, the agency released the acoustic version of the song with Chanyeol on drums, Changmo on piano, and Raiden on guitar. This version premiered on Naver TV, and V Live, before being uploaded to SM Entertainment's YouTube channel on May 14.

== Composition and lyrics ==
"Yours" was composed by Rob Adans, Raiden, Changmo, and Benjamin Samama. Musically, "Yours" is a synth-pop song infused with funky rhythms reminiscent of funk music from the 1970s. CNN Indonesia described the song as a fusion between disco and R&B with a touch of retro by the synthesizer.

"Yours" tells the story of someone who is still pining for an ex-lover after their romantic relationship fell apart. The lyrics also refer to the COVID-19 pandemic and the subsequent social distancing. Raiden aimed for the song to spread positivity and warmth worldwide. Chanyeol, who was also involved in the song's production process revealed that he had been wanting to collaborate with Raiden for quite some time, stating "I've been writing a lot of music and wanting to release new material but I simply could not find the "one."" After listening to the demo of "Yours", Chanyeol was satisfied as it matched what he had envisioned.

Changmo, who was responsible for writing the rap lyrics joined the project after expressing his desire to be part of the song. He claimed that writing the rap lyrics was "cool" as it was different from his usual style of hip-hop music.

== Music video ==
The music video for the song was released simultaneously with the single on May 12.

The concept for the music video originated from Changmo's direction which Lee Hi and Chanyeol liked. The video itself was quite simplistic as it shows Chanyeol moving across four different rooms that portray winter, autumn, summer, and spring. Raiden makes an appearance on the music video playing guitar and a synthesizer.

On May 15, SM Entertainment uploaded a video of the song's production process.

== Commercial performance ==
Within the first week of its release, "Yours" debuted at number 49 on the Gaon Digital Chart for the week of May 10–16. The song debuted at number 5 of Gaon's Download Chart issue for the week of May 10 – May 16. The song ranked at number 44 of Gaon's Download Chart issue of May 2020. The song entered Billboard's K-pop Hot 100 chart debuted at number 99 before peaking at number 53, and spent two weeks on the chart.

In United States, "Yours" debuted on the World Digital Song Sales and peaked at number 8, where it stayed on the chart for a week.

== Live performances ==
The song was performed live for the first time on August 5, 2020, at the 2020 CASS Blue Playground, followed by the upload of the behind-the-scenes video of the artists' participation two days later.

The song was then performed at the SM Town Live 2023: SMCU Palace at Kwangya, with Winter and Mark Lee taking the places of Lee Hi and Changmo respectively.

== Remix ==
On September 17, 2020, SM Entertainment released a Blinders remix of the song.

== Charts ==
Weekly chart performance for Yours
Chart (2020)	Peak position
South Korea (Gaon)	49
South Korea (K-pop Hot 100) (Billboard)	53
US World Digital Songs (Billboard)	8

== Release history ==
Release dates and formats for "Yours"
Region	Date	Format(s)	Version	Label(s)	Ref.
Various	May 12, 2020	Digital download; streaming	Original	SM; ScreaM; Genie Music	
Various	September 17, 2020	Digital download; streaming	Blinders remix	SM; ScreaM	
