= Muggles' Mansion =

Studio album by Code Kunst
- Released: February 28, 2017
- Genre: Hip hop
- Length: 53:05
- Label: Highgrnd

Code Kunst chronology
Crumple (2015)	Muggles' Mansion (2017)	People (2020)

Singles from Muggles' Mansion
- 1. "Parachute" Released: October 21, 2015; 2. "Beside Me" Released: July 26, 2016

Muggles' Mansion is the third studio album of South Korean music producer Code Kunst. It was released on February 28, 2017 through Highgrnd. It was nominated for Hip-Hop Album of the Year at the Korean Hip-hop Awards and peaked at number 26 on the Gaon Album Chart.

== Background ==
In an interview with Sports World, Code Kunst explained how the album was made.

I started planning this album when I made "Parachute". I expressed the emotions I felt at a gathering of many musicians in the songs. Although not all rappers think so, there are people who think that they have risen in status if their music sells well. I wanted to tell them that they are the same as ordinary people through music.

== Music and lyrics ==
Code Kunst thinks of himself as "an ordinary person who makes music, not a celebrity", so he centered the album around this theme. He announces that he is an artist in "Artistic" and talks about his past and present in "Perfume" and "This Is". He compares love to water and fire in "Fire Water" and addresses depression that everyone has in "Born from the Blue". He suggests living slowly in "Cruz" and depicts common fights in relationships in "X". He talks about youth in "Parachute" and religion in "Beside Me". He asserts that life is hard and society is chaotic, but we should ignore them and travel in "Lounge" and wraps up the latter half of the album. Lastly, he adds a track after the outro to show that the life we live is not over yet.

== Critical reception ==
Professional ratings
Review scores
Source	Rating
IZM	3.5/5 stars
Music Y	4.5/5 stars
Rhythmer	3.5/5 stars

Roh Tae-yang of IZM wrote that the featuring artists showed their abilities to the fullest even on "intelligent" beats and Code Kunst unraveled his own story by setting up 19 musicians as his personas. Kim Seong-dae of Music Y wrote that it is "a work in which the owner and the guests stimulate, talk to, and listen to each other and share the results to the world". Lee Jin-seok of Rhythmer praised Code Kunst's "compelling" production but criticized the disappointing performance of some featuring artists.

Lee Taek-yong of IZM rated "Parachute" 3 out of 5 stars. According to him, the groovy beat highlights the strength of Oh Hyuk's voice and makes Dok2's calm rap blend into the song. Above all, it is a "neat" song without excessive emotions.

=== Year-end lists ===
Publication	List	Ref.
IZM	10 Best Korean Albums of 2017	

== Awards and nominations ==
Award	Year	Category	Result	Ref.
Korean Hip-hop Awards	2018	Hip-Hop Album of the Year	Nominated	

== Track listing ==
No.	Title	Length
1.	"Artistic (Intro)"	1:13
2.	"Perfume" (향수) (featuring Nucksal)	3:23
3.	"This Is" (featuring C Jamm)	4:20
4.	"Fire Water (Interlude)"	1:08
5.	"Fire Water" (featuring G.Soul, Tablo)	4:10
6.	"Strongerrr" (featuring Loco, Mino)	4:45
7.	"More Fire"	1:37
8.	"Born from the Blue" (featuring Justhis)	3:07
9.	"Cruz" (featuring Loopy, Punchnello, Ugly Duck)	4:16
10.	"X" (featuring Lee Hi)	5:11
11.	"Parachute" (featuring Oh Hyuk, Dok2)	4:34
12.	"Beside Me" (featuring Bewhy, YDG, Suran)	5:15
13.	"Lounge" (featuring Hwaji)	3:52
14.	"White Anxiety (Outro)" (featuring Colde)	1:42
15.	"Don't Shoot Me Mama" (featuring Car, the Garden)	4:25
Total length:		53:05

== Charts ==
Chart (2017)	Peak position
South Korean Albums (Gaon)	26

== Sales ==
Region	Sales
South Korea	1,231
