= Seoulite (album) =

- Full Album cover

Studio album by Lee Hi
- Released: March 9, 2016 (half album); April 20, 2016 (full album)
- Recorded: 2015–2016
- Studio: Highgrnd (Seoul); YG (Seoul)
- Genre: Retro-soul
- Length: 45:32
- Language: Korean
- Label: YG; KT
- Producer: Tablo; DJ Tukutz; Lee Hi

Lee Hi chronology
First Love (2013)	Seoulite (2016)	Lee Hi Japan Debut Album (2018)

Singles from Seoulite
- 1. "Breathe" Released: March 9, 2016; 2. "Hold My Hand" Released: March 9, 2016; 3. "My Star" Released: April 20, 2016

Half Album cover

Seoulite is the second studio album by South Korean singer and songwriter Lee Hi. The album marked her comeback to the Korean music scene after a three-year hiatus following the release of her debut studio album, First Love, in 2013. The album was released first in a half album format, the first half being released on March 9, 2016, and the full album released digitally on April 20, 2016, and physically a week later.

== Background and release ==
After a successful debut into the Korean music industry at the age of sixteen, to the surprise of many, Lee Hi went on an unofficial hiatus. Much speculation was had around when she would be making her comeback before it was confirmed in August 2015 that Lee would be making her anticipated comeback not through YG Entertainment's main label, but a subsidiary. The sublabel, HIGHGRND, an independent sublabel of YG, is headed by Epik High's Tablo. Though it was confirmed that Lee would still be housed under YG Entertainment, despite releasing under HIGHGRND, YG CEO Yang Hyun-suk stated via an affiliate of the company that the decision for it to be released under the subsidiary was due to worry that he would not be able to manage the comeback to his best abilities, and that his trust in Tablo led him toward the decision to give him production control over her comeback.

On February 15, 2016, it was confirmed that her comeback would be in March. The first teaser for Lee's comeback album, which was revealed to be titled Seoulite, was released on February 29. Rather than releasing a full-length packaged album, it was said that she would be releasing a "half album": one half on March 9, and the second half at a later date. A second teaser, confirming lead single "Breathe", was released on March 2. A third teaser, confirming a second title track named "Hold My Hand", was released on March 4. Following the release of both of the teaser photos and videos, a full track list for the half album was released on March 6.

On March 5, it was revealed that Jonghyun of Shinee had participated in the composition and writing of title track, "Breathe". It was further revealed that Tablo had requested for Jonghyun to write a song for Lee's comeback. The song was chosen to be a second title track by Yang Hyun-suk after leaving a "deep impression" on him, despite not being informed by Tablo that the song was, in fact, composed by Jonghyun until the music video had been filmed.

Seoulite was released digitally on March 9. After its release, "Breathe" ranked first on every major Korean digital chart, achieving a digital music "all kill". Furthermore, the track debuted at number two on Gaon's weekly digital chart, with "Hold My Hand" also debuting in the top ten. The two songs also debuted in first and fourth place, respectively, on the weekly download chart. Beyond this, the album made its debut at number three on Billboard's World Albums chart.

Lee took her first win for "Breathe" on the March 17 broadcast of Mnet's M Countdown.

"Breathe" re-entered Korean digital charts in December 2017, following the death of Jonghyun.

== Track listing ==
Full album track list
No.	Title	Lyrics	Music	Length
1.	"World Tour" (feat. Mino of Winner)	Deanfluenza; Mino	Deanfluenza; Re:One	4:37
2.	"My Star"	Teddy; Kush	Teddy; Kush	3:42
3.	"손잡아 줘요" (Hold My Hand)	Shinae An Wheeler; Tablo	Wheeler	3:39
4.	"희망고문" (Blues)	Tablo	Dee.P; Rebecca Johnson; Tablo	3:56
5.	"한숨" (Breathe)	Jonghyun	Jonghyun; Wefreaky	4:49
6.	"스쳐 간다" (Passing By)	Lee Hi	Lee; Kang Uk-jin	3:19
7.	"Fxxk Wit Us" (feat. Dok2)	Tablo; Dok2; Lee	Tablo; Code Kunst; Ilsey Juber	3:38
8.	"Official" (feat. Incredivle)	Tablo; Incredivle	Chancellor; Docskim	3:29
9.	"안봐도 비디오" (Video) (feat. Bobby of iKon)	Deanfluenza; Bobby	DJ Tukutz; Deanfluenza; Le'mon	3:40
10.	"Missing U"	Tablo	P.K; Lydia Paek	4:08
11.	"밤샘" (Up All Night) (feat. Tablo)	Tablo	Tablo; Kang	3:40
12.	"나는 달라" (I'm Different) (Hi Suhyun feat. Bobby) (Bonus Track)	Masta Wu; Bobby	P.K; Rebecca Johnson	3:35
Total length:				46:07

Seoulite (Part 1)
No.	Title	Lyrics	Music	Length
1.	"World Tour" (feat. Mino of Winner)	Deanfluenza; Mino	Deanfluenza; Re:One	4:37
2.	"손잡아 줘요" (Hold My Hand)	Wheeler; Tablo	Wheeler	3:39
3.	"한숨" (Breathe)	Jonghyun	Jonghyun; Wefreaky	4:49
4.	"Official" (feat. Incredivle)	Tablo; Incredivle	Chancellor; Docskim	3:29
5.	"Fxxk Wit Us" (feat. Dok2)	Tablo; Dok2; Lee	Tablo; Code Kunst; Juber	3:38
Total length:				20:08

Seoulite (Part 2)
No.	Title	Lyrics	Music	Length
1.	"My Star"	Teddy; Kush	Teddy; Kush	3:42
2.	"희망고문" (Blues)	Tablo	Dee.P; Johnson; Tablo	3:56
3.	"스쳐 간다" (Passing By)	Lee	Lee; Kang	3:19
4.	"밤샘" (Up All Night) (feat. Tablo)	Tablo	Tablo; Kang	3:40
5.	"안봐도 비디오" (Video) (feat. Bobby of iKon)	Deanfluenza; Bobby	DJ Tukutz; Deanfluenza; Le'mon	3:40
6.	"Missing U"	Tablo	P.K; Paek	4:08
Total length:				22:29

== Charts ==
Chart	Peak position
US Billboard Heatseekers Albums	16
US Billboard World Albums	3

== Awards and nominations ==
Song	Program	Date
"Breathe"	M! Countdown (Mnet)	March 17, 2016
"Breathe"	Inkigayo (SBS)	March 20, 2016

== Release history ==
Region	Date	Format(s)	Label
South Korea, World	March 9, 2016	Digital Download	YG Entertainment
South Korea, World	April 20, 2016	Digital Download	YG Entertainment
South Korea	April 27, 2016	CD	YG Entertainment
