= Remember Archive =

Studio album by Code Kunst
- Released: March 16, 2023
- Genre: Hip hop; R&B; funk
- Length: 55:09
- Label: AOMG

Code Kunst chronology
People (2020)	Remember Archive (2023)

Singles from Remember Archive
- 1. "Bad Bad" Released: March 8, 2023; 2. "55" Released: March 8, 2023

Remember Archive is the fifth studio album of South Korean record producer Code Kunst. It was released through AOMG on March 16, 2023. It later peaked at number 19 on the Circle Album Chart.

== Cover art ==
The cover art of the album features red. In an interview with Associated Press, Code Kunst said that the color most closely matches the memories that remain very strong in his head and inspired the 17 tracks on the album.

== Music and lyrics ==
On the album, Code Kunst recorded all the precious memories that made him who he is today. The album encompasses a variety of subjects such as "beautiful but sometimes painful love, moments of immature confidence and feeling intimidated, and rough yet deep camaraderie." In terms of music, it features beats that emphasize melody rather than rhythm. The first half is made up of "trendy" songs while the second half is composed of "warm" ones.

"Jumper" is about a romantic relationship between an artist and his fan. Gaeko raps from the perspective of the artist and Mino from that of the fan. "Circle" is a city pop song where Crush focuses on the sensuousness of his pronunciation rather than clarity.

"Page 1" is a "calm" R&B song with a reverbed voice source in the chorus. "55" was inspired by the question "How would I spend my last moment with my loved one 55 minutes before the world ends?" "911" is an R&B pop song that describes the experience of driving around the city in the middle of the night by comparing it to the feelings between lovers.

== Critical reception ==
Park Su-jin of IZM gave the album 3.5 out of 5 stars. She wrote that "the fragments of your memory will slowly come to mind if you listen to the songs one by one following the lyrics and melody." She added that "the musical style of Code Kunst remains like an afterimage."

Hwang Du-ha of Rhythmer also rated the album 3.5 out of 5 stars. He wrote that it is proof that Code Kunst entered a period of stability rather than a fresh attempt or groundbreaking change. Lee Deok-haeng of Ize wrote that Code Kunst filled the album with past memories like a "heaping bowl of rice" in terms of quantity and genre. He concluded that the album is an "important record" that explains who he is.

Critics of Music Y rated "Circle" 3 out of 5 stars. Yoo Seong-eun wrote that it expresses the frustration of being trapped in a relationship in a "mature" way.

=== Year-end list ===
Publication	List	Rank	Ref.
Time Out	30 Best Albums of 2023	15	

== Track listing ==
All music is composed by Code Kunst.

No.	Title	Lyrics	Music	Length
1.	"Remember Archive"		Pick	1:17
2.	"Jumper" (featuring Gaeko, Mino)	Gaeko, Mino	Gaeko, Mino, Pick	3:35
3.	"Bad Bad" (featuring Tabber, Jay Park)	Tabber, Jay Park	Tabber, Jay Park, Pick	3:34
4.	"Circle" (featuring Crush)	Crush	Crush, Pick	3:05
5.	"Home Boy" (featuring Lee Hi)	Lee Hi	Lee Hi	4:06
6.	"Woode" (featuring Woo Won-jae)	Woo Won-jae	Woo Won-jae, Pick	1:42
7.	"Shine" (featuring Woo Won-jae, Tiger JK, Justhis)	Woo Won-jae, Tiger JK, Justhis	Woo Won-jae	3:16
8.	"In the Attic"		Pick	3:18
9.	"Page 1" (featuring Baek Ye-rin, pH-1)	Baek Ye-rin, pH-1	Baek Ye-rin, pH-1, Pick	3:07
10.	"Slip" (이불) (featuring Big Naughty)	Big Naughty	Big Naughty, Pick	2:58
11.	"Little Bit" (featuring Devita)	Devita	Devita, Pick	4:38
12.	"55" (featuring Baek Ye-rin, Wendy)	Baek Ye-rin, Sumin	Baek Ye-rin, Sumin, Pick	3:07
13.	"Terminal" (featuring Sumin, Kid Milli, Chai)	Sumin, Kid Milli, Chai	Sumin, Chai	4:02
14.	"Petty" (featuring Camo, Paul Blanco)	Reo Cragun, Camo, Paul Blanco	Reo Cragun, Paul Blanco	3:47
15.	"911" (featuring Jackson Wang)	Slay, Jackson Wang, Avin	Slay, Pick, Avin	3:17
16.	"Crew" (featuring Coogie, Paloalto, Chin)	Coogie, Paloalto, Chin	Coogie	3:26
17.	"Rec Stop" (ㅇㅁ) (featuring Meenoi)	Meenoi	Meenoi, Pick	2:47
Total length:				55:09

== Charts ==
Chart (2023)	Peak position
South Korean Albums (Circle)	19

== Sales ==
Region	Sales
South Korea	12,784
