= People (Code Kunst album) =

Studio album by Code Kunst
- Released: April 2, 2020
- Genre: Hip-hop
- Length: 55:32
- Label: AOMG

Code Kunst chronology
Muggles' Mansion (2017)	People (2020)	Remember Archive (2023)

Singles from People
- 1. "Joke!" Released: March 12, 2020; 2. "Knock" Released: March 19, 2020

People is the fourth studio album of South Korean music producer Code Kunst. It was released through AOMG on April 2, 2020. It later peaked at number 10 on the Gaon Album Chart.

== Background ==
In an interview with Elle Korea, Code Kunst said that he wanted to share gratitude and happiness with others through the album.

== Music and lyrics ==
Taking up the theme of various emotions people feel, Code Kunst unfolds the narrative of the album. He compares people to the appearance and symbolism of flowers in "Flower" and expresses his frustration with superficial relationships in "F(ucked up)". He concludes the album with "People" which encourages listeners to continue to trust people.

== Critical reception ==
Roh Tae-yang of IZM rated the album 3.5 out of 5 stars. He noted that Code Kunst was liberated from auteurism to some extent when he made it. He concluded that although it may not be original, it is a "warm-hearted explanation" about the direction of his present and future works.

Lee Jin-seok of Rhythmer also rated it 3.5 out of 5 stars. He wrote that although it is not an album that is unique or original, it is a "convincing" work with solid structure and content that sticks to the intention of it.

Critics of Music Y rated "Flower" 4 out of 5 stars. Yeolsimhi called it a "masterpiece" that Code Kunst at this time can make. Yoo Seong-eun wrote that although it may not satisfy people who expected a song with a more popular appeal, it shows the worries of a producer living in the same era as us.

== Track listing ==
All music is composed by Code Kunst.

No.	Title	Lyrics	Music	Length
1.	"Knock" (featuring Baek Ye-rin)	Baek Ye-rin, Elo	Baek Ye-rin	3:19
2.	"Flower" (꽃; Kkot) (featuring Jay Park, Woo Won-jae and Giriboy)	Jay Park, Woo Won-jae, Giriboy	Jay Park	4:33
3.	"Xii"	Code Kunst	Lee Hi	0:56
4.	"O" (featuring Lee Hi)	Lee Hi	Lee Hi, DeVita	3:32
5.	"Woode"			1:58
6.	"F(ucked up)" (featuring Gaeko and Gray)	Gaeko, Gray	Gray	3:39
7.	"Set Me Free" (featuring Loopy and Jvcki Wai)	Loopy, Jcvki Wai	Loopy, Jvcki Wai	4:11
8.	"Joke!" (featuring C Jamm and Simon Dominic)	C Jamm, Simon Dominic	C Jamm	3:47
9.	"Get Out" (featuring Kid Milli, EK, and Haon)	Kid Milli, EK, Haon		4:28
10.	"Rollin" (featuring pH-1)	pH-1	pH-1	3:06
11.	"Let U In" (featuring DeVita and Colde)	DeVita, Colde, Jayho	DeVita, Colde	3:25
12.	"Dirt in My Head" (featuring Car, the Garden)	Car, the Garden, Code Kunst	Car, the Garden	4:17
13.	"Bronco" (featuring Bassagong, Blnk, Jayho and Jaedal)	Jayho, Bassagong, Blnk, Jaedal		3:54
14.	"Dance" (춤; Chum) (featuring Nucksal)	Nucksal		3:29
15.	"People" (featuring Paloalto and The Quiett)	Paloalto, The Quiett	Paloalto	3:39
16.	"No More Fire"			3:10
Total length:				55:32

== Charts ==
Chart (2020)	Peak position
South Korean Albums (Gaon)	10

== Sales ==
Region	Sales
South Korea	6,466
