= Hi Suhyun =

South Korean vocal duo

Hi Suhyun 하이 수현
- Origin: Seoul, South Korea
- Genre: K-pop
- Years active: 2014
- Label: YG Entertainment
- Past members: Lee Hi; Lee Su-hyun

Hi Suhyun (Korean: 하이 수현) was a South Korean duo formed by YG Entertainment in 2014, consisting of Lee Hi and Lee Su-hyun from Akdong Musician. They released the number one single, "I'm Different", in November 2014.

== Discography ==
=== Singles ===
Year	Title	Peak chart positions	Sales
Year	Title	KOR	Sales
2014	"I'm Different" (featuring Bobby)	1	KOR: 830,538+
"—" denotes releases that did not chart or were not released in that region.

== Awards and nominations ==
=== Seoul Music Awards ===
Year	Nominee / work	Award	Result
2015	Hi Suhyun	Bonsang	Nominated
2015	Hi Suhyun	Popularity Award	Nominated
2015	Hi Suhyun	Hallyu Special Award	Nominated
