= Lee Su-hyun =

South Korean singer (born 1999)

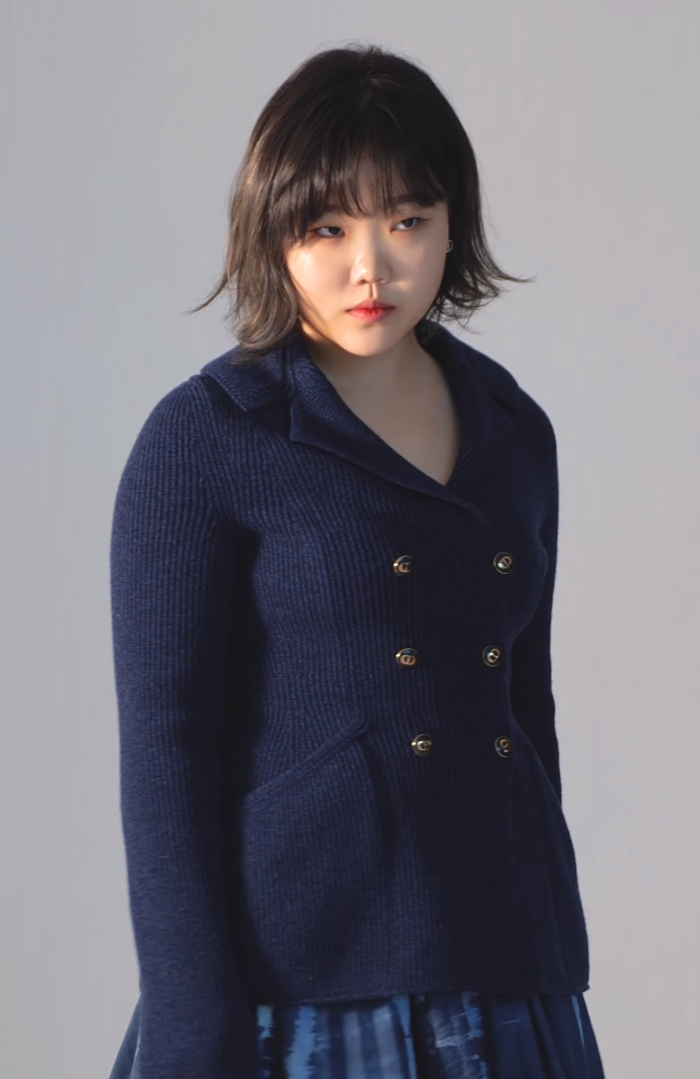
- Lee at a photoshoot for Marie Claire Korea in 2021
- Born: May 4, 1999 (age 27); Gyeonggi Province, South Korea
- Occupations: Singer; actress; radio DJ
- Relatives: Lee Chan-hyuk (brother)
- Musical career
- Origin: Seoul, South Korea
- Genre: K-pop
- Instrument: Vocals
- Years active: 2014–present
- Label: Fountain of Inpiration
- Member of: AKMU
- Formerly of: Hi Suhyun; YG Family
- Website: yg-akmu.com

Korean name
- Hangul: 이수현
- Hanja: 李秀賢
- RR: I Suhyeon
- MR: I Suhyŏn

Lee Su-hyun (Korean: 이수현; born May 4, 1999), is a South Korean singer. Following her appearance on the SBS audition program K-pop Star 2 alongside her brother Lee Chan-hyuk, she debuted as the vocalist of the sibling duo AKMU on April 7, 2014, under YG Entertainment after winning the show. She was also part of the duo Hi Suhyun - formed in 2014 with Lee Hi. She debuted as a solo artist on October 16, 2020, with the digital single "Alien".

On television, she has appeared as a series regular on reality music programs including Begin Again as well as a judge on the audition program Superband. Lee also became a YouTuber through her channel, Leesuhyun, and a radio DJ for a KBS Cool FM show, AKMU Suhyun's Volume Up, where she received her first award at the 16th KBS Entertainment Awards for "Radio DJ Award". She has also sung original soundtracks for Korean television dramas including It's Okay to Not Be Okay, and the Disney live-action film Mulan.

== Biography ==
=== Early life ===
Lee Su-hyun was born on May 4, 1999, in Gyeonggi Province, South Korea. She and her older brother, Lee Chan-hyuk, moved to Mongolia at the Korean age of 10 and 13 respectively with their missionary parents. Describing her childhood, she explained: "We liked going out to explore nature in Mongolia. Just beyond the city, there would be vast grasslands and cloud-filled skies." Due to her family facing financial difficulties, the two siblings were unable to go to school for education and instead were home-schooled by their mother.

Her experience in Mongolia helped her brother and her to discover their talent for music, as sheer boredom from being home-schooled prompted them to start making music together. Lee then learned the piano while her brother learned the guitar. Additionally, while watching SBS variety program Star King, she found the voice of a girl named Shannon intriguingly beautiful, also triggering her to pursue music. After residing in Mongolia for almost five years, Lee temporarily moved back to South Korea due to an issue with her visa. During her stay, she took part in an audition and decided to remain there, her brother soon followed suit.

=== 2012–2017: AKMU, Hi Suhyun and acting debut ===
In August 2012, she and her brother auditioned for SBS' K-pop Star 2 as AKMU, soon finishing in first place and later signing under YG Entertainment. In April 2014, they debuted with studio album, Play alongside three lead singles, "200%", "Give Love" and "Melted". The digital single, "Time and Fallen Leaves", released in October also spawned to number one on the Gaon Digital Chart, solidifying their instantaneously commercial success. They acquired multiple awards that year including "Best Pop Album" at the Korean Music Awards and "Song of the Year (April)" at the Gaon Chart Music Awards. In September 2017, Chan-hyuk enlisted in the Korean Marine Corps, thereby AKMU going into hiatus.

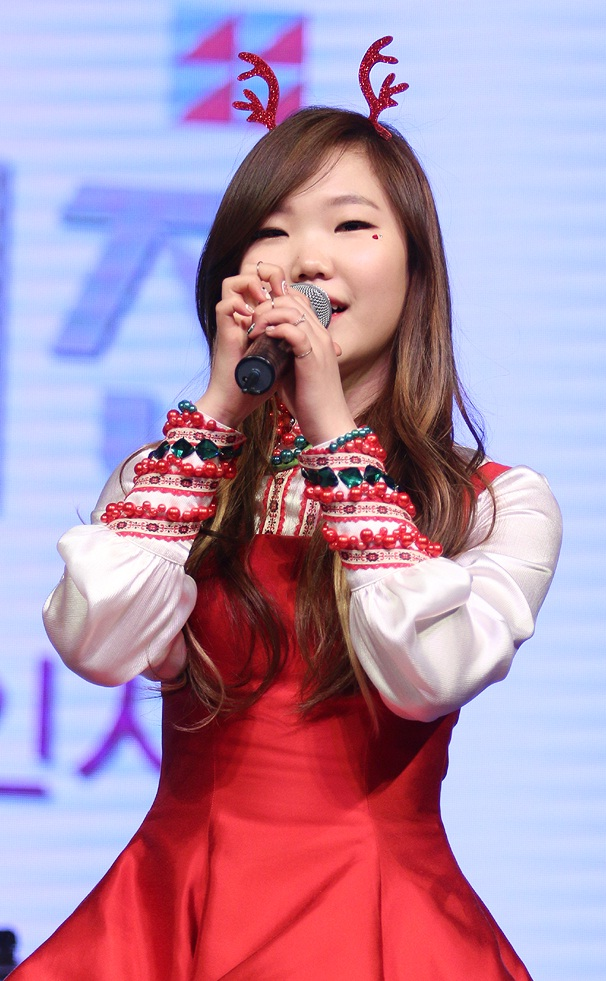
Lee performing at the SBS Gayo Daejeon in 2014

In November 2014, the project sub-unit Hi Suhyun was formed between Lee and her labelmate Lee Hi. The duo released the digital single, "I'm Different" featuring labelmate Bobby of iKon and soon topped all domestic charts upon release including the Gaon Digital Chart. They began promotions on November 16 through their first music show appearance on SBS' Inkigayo, and soon claimed their first win on November 23. The duo were also nominated for multiple awards at the Seoul Music Awards including the "Bonsang", "Popularity Award" and Hallyu Special Award".

Following media outlets revelation of a new show on May 23, 2017, Lee joined as a fixed cast member of OnStyle variety program Relationship Appeal, where she was joined by labelmates Sandara Park of 2NE1 and Lee Hi. Her addition to the line-up also marked her first fixed appearance on a television show since debut. Relationship Appeal consisted of 5 episodes and was aired within the time span of July to October 2017.

On May 25, 2017, Lee created the beauty YouTube channel, MochiPeach, and publicly uploaded her first-ever video on June 3. Initially only uploading contents relating to beauty, she soon expanded her channel to cover materials including vlogs and music covers. She first voiced her interest in opening a YouTube channel once she's older through My Little Television in 2016. She revealed on MBC's Omniscient Interfering View that upon seeing this, YG Entertainment formed a YouTube team for her as encouragement. Lee received the YouTube Gold Play Button in July 2019. In August 2019, she renamed her channel to Leesuhyun, and garnered a total of 1.4 million subscribers as of December 2019.

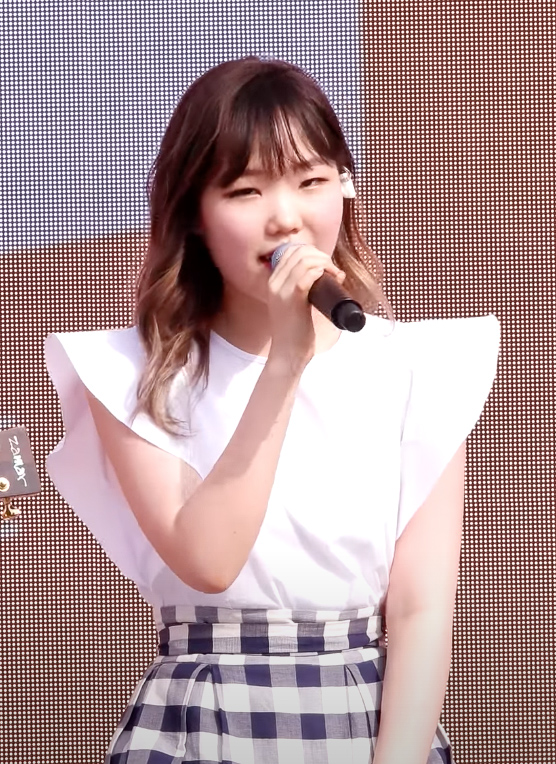
Lee performing in May 2016

Through the Netflix television series Temporary Idol, Lee made her acting debut by joining the main cast as a character depicting herself. The web drama was joined by Kwon Hyun-bin, Kim Hee-jung, Hwang Seung-eon and Kwon Young-deuk through the joint production of YG Entertainment and Netflix. The show was aired through Netflix in November 2017 and soon on SBS in December 2017.

On December 27, 2017, Lee was confirmed to be the newest addition of the second installment of JTBC reality program Begin Again. Initially with the show split into two teams while filming overseas separately in different locations, she was placed in the team consisting of Lena Park, Hareem and Henry Lau. Begin Again 2 was filmed in areas located in Portugal and Hungary and began airing from March 30, 2018, to June 29, 2018. Through her renewed appearance on the third installment of the Begin Again series, she became a series regular, remaining with her previous teammates alongside new addition, Kim Feel and Lim Heon-il. Begin Again 3 was filmed in areas located in South Korea and Italy.

=== 2018–present: Radio DJ, television appearances and solo debut ===
KBS Cool FM (89.1 MHz) welcomed Lee through an announcement on May 3, 2018, as their newest radio DJ for Volume Up. She became the ninth official radio DJ for the show as a successor of her predecessor, Kim Ye-won. Her tenure on the show was from June 4, 2018, to January 5, 2020. Her role as a Radio DJ went on to earning her the "Radio DJ Award" at the 16th KBS Entertainment Award in 2018.

Through the tvN historical melodrama Mr. Sunshine, Lee became the fourth artist to release a soundtrack for the television drama on July 29, 2018. Domestically, the soundtrack peaked at number 74 on the Gaon Digital Chart and number 72 on the Billboard Korea K-pop 100 chart.

Lee also made a featuring on Jannabi's digital single, "Made in Christmas", which was released on December 25, 2018.

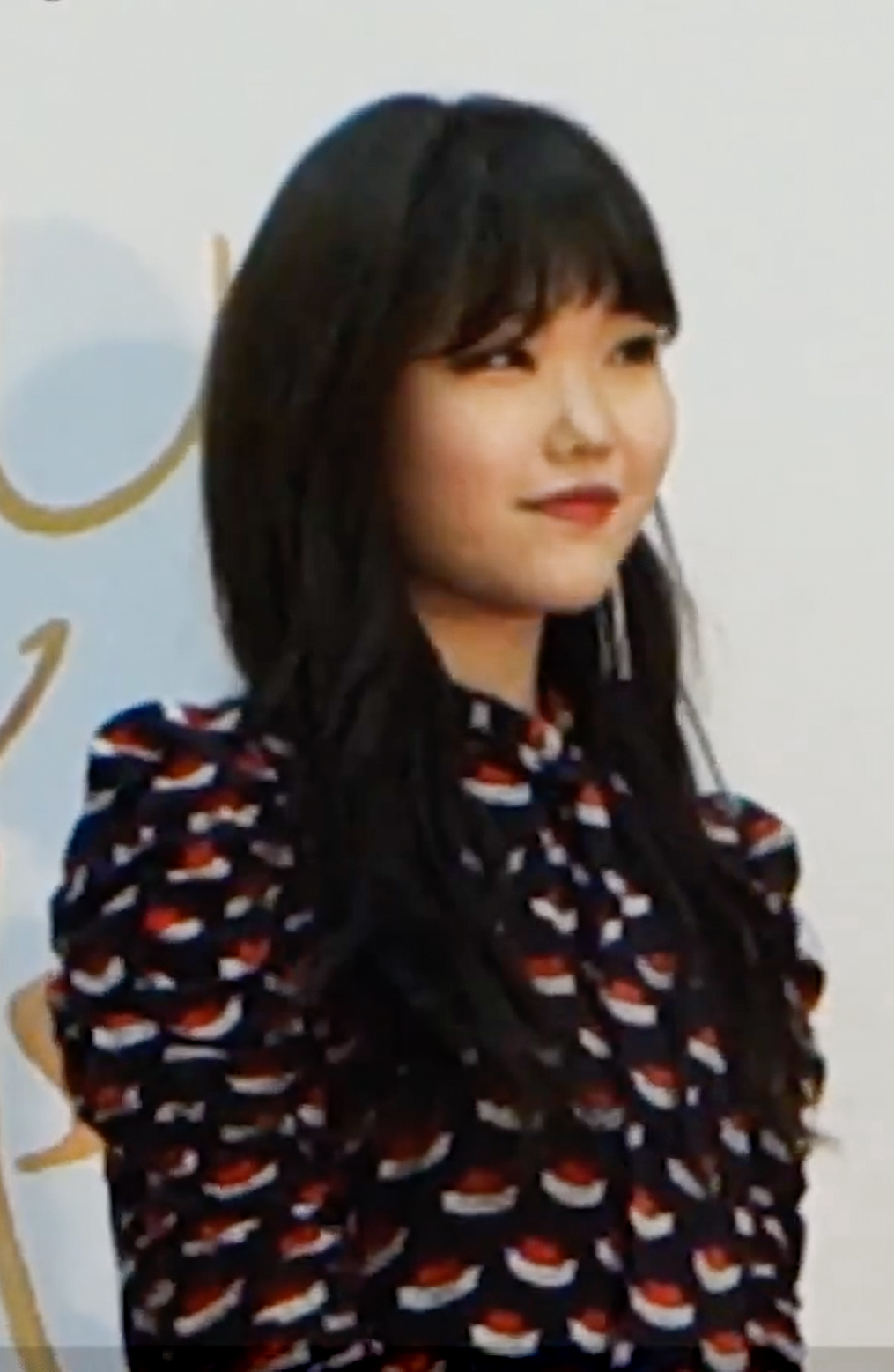
Lee at the 32nd Golden Disk Awards in 2018

Lee partook in JTBC audition program Superband as the youngest and only female judge. During a press conference held on April 11, 2019, in response to her role in the show, she answered: "As a person who has competed on an audition stage, the role of a judge is scary. So rather than thinking of myself as a producer, I am looking for charming people whom I want to be friends with and also work with."

On April 27, 2019, Lee was invited to participate in the first anniversary of the Panmunjom Declaration event, where peace and reunification of the Korean Peninsula was adopted between the Supreme Leader of North Korea, Kim Jong Un, and the President of South Korea, Moon Jae-in, during the April 2018 inter-Korean summit. She performed a Korean version of the Pocahontas original soundtrack "Colors of the Wind".

In September 2019, through AKMU's third studio album Sailing, Lee was credited as the arranger for the B-side track "Farewell" (작별 인사), marking her first-ever participation among their releases. Through the Naver Now radio show, Jukjae Night Time Studio, Lee revealed the process stating with minimal knowledge, she had difficulty creating a bass line, but was still able to create a detailed instrumental distribution after playing random chords for the first demo recording. She then recruited Jukjae and Hareem to record a more polished instrumentation, leading to the addition of their album.

On June 6, 2020, Lee was invited to the 65th Annual Memorial Day Ceremony, held at the Memorial Plaza in Daejeon National Cemetery, and was broadcast on KBS, MBC and SBS. The occasion was hosted by the actor, Kim Dong-wook and announcer Lee Jung-min as well as attended by the South Korea president, Moon Jae-in. Family of the patriotic martyrs of the Korean war attended and read letters and stories of the late major Lim Chun-soo, who died in battle with a letter and picture of his family held close to his heart. She performed "Father", in which the lyrics stated: "father who protected me", and expressed her condolences.

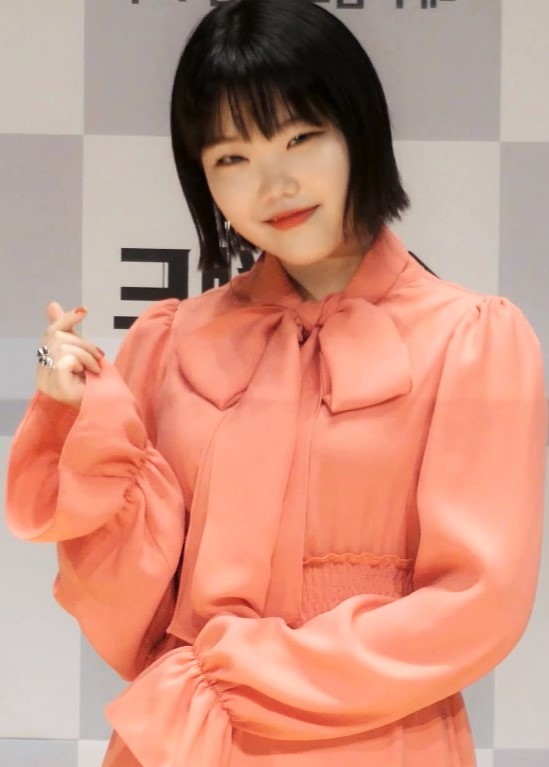
Lee at the Superband press conference in 2019

Through the tvN romantic drama It's Okay to Not Be Okay, Lee became the fourth artist to release a soundtrack for the television drama. Upon release, the original soundtrack, "In Your Time" (아직 너의 시간에 살아), spawned to number one on South Korean music streaming platforms including Genie and Bugs on July 14. Domestically, the soundtrack also peaked at number 31 on the Gaon Digital Chart and number 33 on the Billboard Korea K-pop 100 chart. The soundtrack was physically released within the It's Okay to Not Be Okay OST album on August 13.

Upon receiving a call from Disney, Lee accepted the proposal to sing the Korean version of "Reflection" (숨겨진 내 모습) of the upcoming Disney live-action movie, Mulan. In response she stated: "As a Disney fan, I'm really happy to participate in a song that has long been loved by many people." The official soundtrack was released on August 31 ahead of the film's domestic release on September 10. The music video released through the platforms, YouTube and Naver TV received attention garnering over 1 million views domestically within 2 days, and peaked at number 3 on the Naver TV top 100 popular videos chart while remaining within the top 10 for one week upon release.

On September 4, media outlets reported Lee would make her official solo debut within fall that year, to which her label responded to anticipate an official announcement soon. Previously through the JTBC variety program, Knowing Bros, she revealed despite her brother leaving songs for her to release during his enlistment, Lee revealed she refused to use music produced by him and instead would rather take time until she was fully satisfied. Soon, YG Entertainment announced Lee would officially debut as a solo artist on October 16 with the digital single "Alien".

In November 2025, AKMU decided to part ways with YG Entertainment after 12 years and reportedly in talks to establish an independent label.

== Other ventures ==
=== Endorsement ===
In November 2018, Lee was chosen to be a model for Korean beauty platform Glow Pick. She also participated in composing and singing the song for the commercial.

=== Philanthropy ===
Following the COVID-19 pandemic, Lee made a donation of 50 million won on April 1, 2020, to the Daegu Dongsan Hospital medical staff.

== Discography ==
=== Charted songs ===
Title	Year	Peak chart positions		Sales	Album
Title	Year	KOR Circle	KOR Hot (Note: The K-pop Hot 100 was discontinued on July 16, 2014. The chart was later re-established following the term date of May 29 – June 4, 2017.)	Sales	Album
As lead artist
"Alien"	2020	41	14	N/A	Non-album singles
"Blue Lagoon" (푸른 산호초)	2026	119	—N/a	N/A	Non-album singles
Collaborations
"Goodbye Sun, Goodbye Moon" (with Toy)	2014	9	—	KOR: 254,660	Da Capo
As featured artist
"The Benefits of the Heartbreak" (상실의 순기능) (Epik High featuring Suhyun)	2017	8	13	KOR: 208,377	We've Done Something Wonderful
"Sleepless in Seoul" (10cm featuring Suhyun)	2021	37	16	N/A	[5.2]
Soundtrack appearances
"Sori" (소리)	2018	74	72	N/A	Mr. Sunshine OST
"In Your Time" (아직 너의 시간에 살아)	2020	31	32	N/A	It's Okay to Not Be Okay OST
"Reflection" (숨겨진 내 모습)	2020	143	—	N/A	Mulan OST
"Love and Pain"	2021	— (Note: "Love and Pain" did not enter the Gaon Digital Chart, but appeared at number 46 on the component Gaon Download Chart.)	65	N/A	Lovestruck in the City OST
"My Spring" (나의 봄은)	2022	— (Note: "My Spring" did not enter the Gaon Digital Chart, but appeared at number 48 on the component Gaon Download Chart.)	—	N/A	My Liberation Notes OST
"Stand By Your Side"	2022	— (Note: "Stand By Your Side" did not enter the Circle Digital Chart, but appeared at number 49 on the component Circle Download Chart.)	—	N/A	Curtain Call OST
"—" denotes a recording that did not chart or was not released in that territory.

=== Other songs ===
Title	Year	Sales	Album
"Who Am I" (Sua featuring Suhyun)	2015	KOR: 16,831	Unpretty Rapstar 2
"I Did Not Want Love From You"	2016	N/A	Immortal Songs: Singing the Legend
"Red Carpet" (with Hyun-bin, Deukie, Hee-Jung and Seung-eon)	2017	N/A	Temporary Idols
"Ice Cafe" (with Hyun-bin, Deukie, Hee-Jung and Seung-eon)	2017	N/A	Temporary Idols
"Made in Christmas" (Jannabi featuring Suhyun)	2018	N/A	Non-album single
"Love One" (사랑 하나; Live Ver.) (with Kim Feel, Henry, Hareem and Heon-il)	2019	N/A	Begin Again Season 3 Episode 2
"There's Nothing Holdin' Me Back" (with Lena, Henry, Kim Feel and Hareem)	2019	N/A	Begin Again Season 3 Episode 4
"I Love You" (Busking Ver.) (with Kim Feel, Henry, Hareem and Heon-il)	2019	N/A	Begin Again Season 3 Episode 12
"Chocolate Story" (초콜릿 이야기) (with Heon-il, Lena, Kim Feel, Henry and Hareem)	2019	N/A	Begin Again Season 3 Episode 14
"Love the Moon" (달을 사랑해) (Viini featuring Suhyun and Bloo)	2020	N/A	Moon & Butterfly
"Love Me Love You" (Lucy with Kim Eana and Suhyun)	2021	N/A	Non-album single
"Santa Claus Is Comin' to Town"	2022	N/A	2022 Christmas Vibe - Lee Soo-hyun
"Hopeless Romantic" (사랑이라 믿었던 것들은) (Big Naughty featuring Suhyun)	2023	N/A	Hopeless Romantic
"The Veiled Path" (가리워진 길)	2023	N/A	The Seasons: ReːWake Project VOL II. 13 Lee Su-hyun - The Veiled Path

=== Writing credits ===
All song credits are adapted from the Korea Music Copyright Association's database, unless otherwise noted.

Song	Artist(s)	Album	Lyrics		Music		Arrangement		Year
Song	Artist(s)	Album	Credited	With	Credited	With	Credited	With	Year
"Canaricano" (까나리카노)	Various Artists	Non-album single	Yes	Lee Chan-hyuk; Defconn; Kim Jong-min	Yes	Lee Chan-hyuk	Yes	Lee Chan-hyuk	2017
"Volume Up Logo Song" (볼륨을높여요 Logo Song)	Lee Su-hyun	Non-album single	Yes	—N/a	Yes	—N/a	No	—N/a	2018
"MOCHIPEACH"	Lee Su-hyun	Non-album single	Yes	—N/a	Yes	—N/a	No	Lee Hyun-young	2018
"MOCHIPEACH (WINTER VER.)"	Lee Su-hyun	Non-album single	Yes	—N/a	Yes	—N/a	Yes	choipin	2018
"For Those Who Can't Fall Asleep Easily" (쉽게잠들지못하는그대들을위해)	Lee Su-hyun	Non-album single	Yes	—N/a	Yes	—N/a	No	—N/a	2019
"Volume Up Logo Song 2" (볼륨을높여요 Logo Song 2)	Lee Su-hyun	Non-album single	Yes	—N/a	Yes	—N/a	No	choipin	2019
"Farewell" (작별 인사)	AKMU	Sailing	No	Lee Chan-hyuk	No	Lee Chan-hyuk	Yes	—N/a	2019

== Videography ==
=== Music videos ===
Year	Title	Director(s)	Ref.
2020	"Alien"	Han Sa-min	

== Filmography ==
=== Web series ===
Year	Title	Role	Notes	Ref.
2017	Part-Time Idol	Herself		
2018	YG Future Strategy Office	Herself	Cameo (Episode 8)	
2021	Mad for Each Other	Herself		

=== Television shows ===
Year	Title	Role	Notes	Ref.
2012–2013	K-pop Star Season 2	Contestant	Winner as Akdong Musician	
2017	King of Mask Singer	Contestant	Episode 99–100	
2017	Relationship Appeal (사이어필)	Cast member		
2018–present	Begin Again	Cast member	Season 2–4	
2019	Superband	Judge		
2021	Sea of Hope	Cast member		

=== Films ===
Year	Title	Role	Notes	Ref.
2025	Your Letter	Sori Lee	Voice role	

=== Web shows ===
Year	Title	Role	Notes	Ref.
2023	Nineteen to Twenty	Host	with Kyuhyun and Kim Ji-eun	

=== Music video appearances ===
Year	Title	Director(s)	Artist	Ref.
2020	"Hold" (뜸)	Ha Jeong-hoon	Winner	

=== Radio ===
Year	Title	Role	Ref.
2018–2020	AKMU Suhyun's Volume Up	DJ	
2021	Suhyun's Forest	DJ	
2022	Noon's Hope Song, Kim Shin-young	Special DJ	

== Awards and nominations ==
Name of the award ceremony, year presented, award category, nominee(s) of the award, and the result of the nomination
Award ceremony	Year	Category	Nominee(s)/work(s)	Result	Ref.
KBS Entertainment Awards	2018	Radio DJ Award	AKMU Su-hyun's Volume Up	Won	
Korea First Brand Awards	2021	Best Vocal – Female	Lee Su-hyun	Won	
Seoul International Drama Awards	2021	Outstanding Korean Drama OST	"Love and Pain"	Nominated	
Seoul Music Awards	2021	OST Award	"In Your Time"	Nominated	
