= First Love (Lee Hi album) =

- First Love, Pt. 2

Studio album by Lee Hi
- Released: March 7, 2013
- Recorded: 2012–2013
- Genre: K-pop; jazz; R&B
- Length: 34:01 (digital version); 41:58 (physical version)
- Language: Korean
- Label: YG Entertainment; KMP Holdings
- Producer: Yang Hyun-suk

Lee Hi chronology
First Love (2013)	Seoulite (2016)

Singles from First Love
- 1. "1, 2, 3, 4" Released: October 29, 2012; 2. "Scarecrow" Released: November 22, 2012; 3. "It's Over" Released: March 7, 2013; 4. "Rose" Released: March 28, 2013

First Love, Pt. 1

First Love is the debut studio album by South Korean singer Lee Hi. Before its release, her agency, YG Entertainment, stated that Lee Hi would take on genres like jazz and rhythm and blues that are rarely heard in the K-pop industry.

== Background and release ==
Lee Hi's first teaser picture was released on February 25, 2013. It depicted Lee Hi with three questions floating around her, "March 1st?", "March 7th?", and "March 21st?" Given that her comeback had been delayed multiple times before this picture led fans to believe it had been delayed once again. The second teaser was released on February 26, 2013, and created similar confusion, depicting Lee Hi posing with the questions "Mini?", "Single?" and "Album?" floating above her head.

On March 1, 2013, Lee Hi's official YouTube channel pre-released "Turn It Up", the intro to her upcoming full-length album. This revealed the "March 1st?" question on her second teaser. It was announced that March 7 would see the digital release of a preview mini-album featuring the first five songs off of First Love. From this release she promoted "It's Over" as a title track, winning her first Inkigayo mutizen on March 24 with the song. The full album was originally scheduled for release on March 21 but was later delayed to March 28. "Rose" served as the title track of the album's physical release, reaching the summit of Gaon's national singles chart.

== Track listing ==
The track listing and credits were revealed by YG Entertainment.

No.	Title	Lyrics	Music	Length
1.	"Turn It Up" (Intro)	Tablo	Kush, Lydia Paek	1:47
2.	"Special" (featuring Jennie of Blackpink)	Tablo	Choice37, Lydia Paek	3:56
3.	"It's Over"	Masta Wu	Rovin, Lydia Paek	3:54
4.	"짝사랑" (Jjaksarang; One-Sided Love)	Sunwoo Jung-a	Sunwoo Jung-a	3:54
5.	"Dream"	REALMEEE	REALMEEE	4:49
6.	"Rose"	Teddy	Teddy, Song Baek Kyung	3:42
7.	"바보" (Babo; Fool for Love)	Tablo	Q, Lydia Paek	4:05
8.	"Because"	REALMEEE	REALMEEE	4:18
9.	"내가 이상해" (Naega Isanghae; Am I Strange)	Sunwoo Jung-a	Sunwoo Jung-a	3:36
Total length:				34:01

Physical edition bonus tracks
No.	Title	Lyrics	Music	Length
10.	"1, 2, 3, 4" (Bonus track)	Masta Wu	Choice37, Lydia Paek	3:34
11.	"허수아비" (Scarecrow; hidden track)	Park Jin-young	Park Jin-young	4:23
Total length:				41:58

== Chart performance ==
=== It's Over ===
Singles Chart	Peak position
Billboard Korea	4
Gaon	3

=== Rose ===
Singles Chart	Peak position
Billboard Korea	1
Gaon	1

=== Other charted songs ===
Song	Peak position	
Song	KOR	KOR
Song	Gaon Chart	K-Pop Billboard
"Special"	21	16
"One-Sided Love"	23	21
"Dream"	44	35
"Turn It Up" (Intro)	64	-
"내가 이상해" (Am I Strange)	101	85
"Because"	79	56
"바보" (Fool)	62	43

== Release history ==
Region	Date	Format(s)	Label
South Korea	March 7, 2013	Digital Download (EP - Part 1)	YG Entertainment
Worldwide	March 7, 2013	Digital Download (EP - Part 1)	YG Entertainment
South Korea	March 28, 2013	Digital Download (EP - Part 2)	YG Entertainment
Worldwide	March 28, 2013	Digital Download (EP - Part 2)	YG Entertainment
South Korea	April 2, 2013	CD (Full album)	YG Entertainment
Taiwan	May 10, 2013	CD; CD+DVD	Warner Music Taiwan
