= I'm Different (Hi Suhyun song) =

Single by Hi Suhyun featuring Bobby
- Released: November 11, 2014
- Recorded: 2014
- Studio: YG (Seoul)
- Genre: R&B
- Length: 3:34
- Label: YG; KT
- Composers: P.K.; Rebecca Johnson
- Lyricists: Masta Wu; Bobby
- Producers: P.K; Bekuh BOOM

Music video
- "I'm Different" on YouTube

"I'm Different" (Korean: 나는 달라; RR: Naneun Dalla) is the debut single by YG Family unit Hi Suhyun, consisting of Lee Hi and Akdong Musician's Lee Su-hyun. It also features Bobby of iKON. The song was released digitally on November 11, 2014, by YG Entertainment and KT Music. This is the unit's only release before Lee Hi's departure from YG Entertainment on December 31, 2019. Blackpink's Jisoo appeared in the music video.

Billboard magazine described the song as a jazzy, funk-inspired duet that captures the two singers' unique energies and music styles.

== Release and performance ==
"I'm Different" ranked number 1 on the weekly Gaon Digital Chart the first week of release. For the month of November, the "I'm Different" music video was number 2 in a list of most viewed K-pop videos in the U.S., as well as number 3 globally. On November 23, the song won first place on the music show Inkigayo.

== Charts ==
| Country | Chart | Peak position | Digital Sales |
|---|---|---|---|
| South Korea (Gaon Music Chart) | Digital Chart | 1 | 830,695+ |
| South Korea (Gaon Music Chart) | Mobile Chart | 19 | 830,695+ |

== Release history ==
Release history for "I'm Different"
| Region | Date | Format | Label |
|---|---|---|---|
| Various | November 11, 2014 | Digital download; streaming | YG; KT |
