= 24°C =

- Digital cover

EP by Lee Hi
- Released: May 30, 2019
- Recorded: 2017–2019
- Studio: YG (Seoul)
- Genre: R&B; pop
- Length: 17:25
- Language: Korean
- Label: YG

Lee Hi chronology
Lee Hi Japan Debut Album (2018)	24°C (2019)	4 Only (2021)

Alternative cover
- Physical version

Singles from 24°C
- 1. "No One (누구없소)" Released: May 30, 2019

24 °C is the first EP by South Korean singer and songwriter Lee Hi, released on May 30, 2019, through YG Entertainment. It is Lee's first release since her three-year hiatus following the release of her studio album in 2016. The EP features the lead single "No One" (누구없소). It is Lee Hi's final release under YG Entertainment.

== Background ==
On January 15, 2019, Lee released the digital single "XI" with Code Kunst; the track was sung live for the first time on MBC Dreaming Radio. Lee received her first music show win for single "No One" through Mnet's M Countdown on June 6.

== Music and composition ==
At five tracks, 24°C is the shortest material in Lee Hi's catalogue. The album explores the dark side of romantic relationships, the loneliness and the longing, the frustrating relationships, and the break-ups. Musically, 24°C combines these mostly darker themes with generally upbeat musical genres.

The opening track of the album, "No One" featuring B.I of iKon, as a reggaeton-infused dance track with a "groovy" tune full of vibrant percussion, smooth melodies, and quirky synths. It expresses the longing of a lonely person waiting for a lover to arrive with a knock on her door. Lee Hi's collaboration with G.Soul, "No Way", is an "unashamedly laid back track" with a piano and a low bass. "Love Is Over" is "a gospel, soul-infused ballad" with a jazzy swing rhythm. It functions very much as a typical break-up tune, reflecting on the struggle to move on the relationship. "1,2" featuring Choi Hyunsuk of Treasure, is a "short but sweet" track. "20Min" is the only self-written song by Lee on the album. The "guitar-led ballad" details her anger and annoyance with a certain someone over gentle guitar strums and the sound of water-drops.

== Promotion ==
Promotion for the EP began following a coming soon poster released by YG Entertainment on May 20, 2019. On May 22, the date and title of the EP were unveiled, with pre-order details following on the same day. On May 25, a concept teaser of the lead single "No One" premiered, and soon after, the track list was revealed on May 27. Lee's first music show appearance was on MBC's Show! Music Core on June 1. On June 5, Lee had a live stage broadcast on Naver Vlive with Vibe, with 40 fans chosen to attend the showcase. On June 11, Lee appeared on JTBC's Idol Room.

== Track listing ==
24°C track listing
No.	Title	Lyrics	Music	Arrangement	Length
1.	"No One" (누구없소; Nugueobs-so) (featuring B.I of iKon)	윤명운; Kim Min-Gu; B.I	윤명운; Kang Uk-Jin; Diggy; Kim Min-Gu	Kang Uk-Jin; Diggy	3:14
2.	"No Way" (featuring G.Soul)	Jaeman; Davey Nate	JBird; Jr.; Davey Nate	JBird; Davey Nate	4:16
3.	"Love Is Over"	민연재; BigTone; Airplay	Airplay; Davey Nate	Airplay	3:37
4.	"1, 2" (한두번; Handubeon) (featuring Choi Hyun-suk of Treasure)	B.I; Choi Hyun-Suk	Kang Uk-Jin; B.I	Kang Uk-Jin	3:22
5.	"20Min" (20분전; 20bunjeon)	Lee Hi	로빈; Lee Hi	로빈; 타린	2:56
Total length:					17:25

== Charts ==
Chart performance of 24°C
Chart (2019)	Peak position
France Digital Albums (SNEP)	129
South Korean Albums (Gaon)	11
US Heatseekers Albums (Billboard)	2
US World Albums (Billboard)	7

== Release history ==
Release history for 24°C
Country	Date	Format	Label	Ref.
Various	May 30, 2019	Digital download; streaming	YG Entertainment	
South Korea	May 31, 2019	CD	YG Entertainment	
