= Code Kunst =

South Korean music producer (born 1989)

Code Kunst 코드 쿤스트
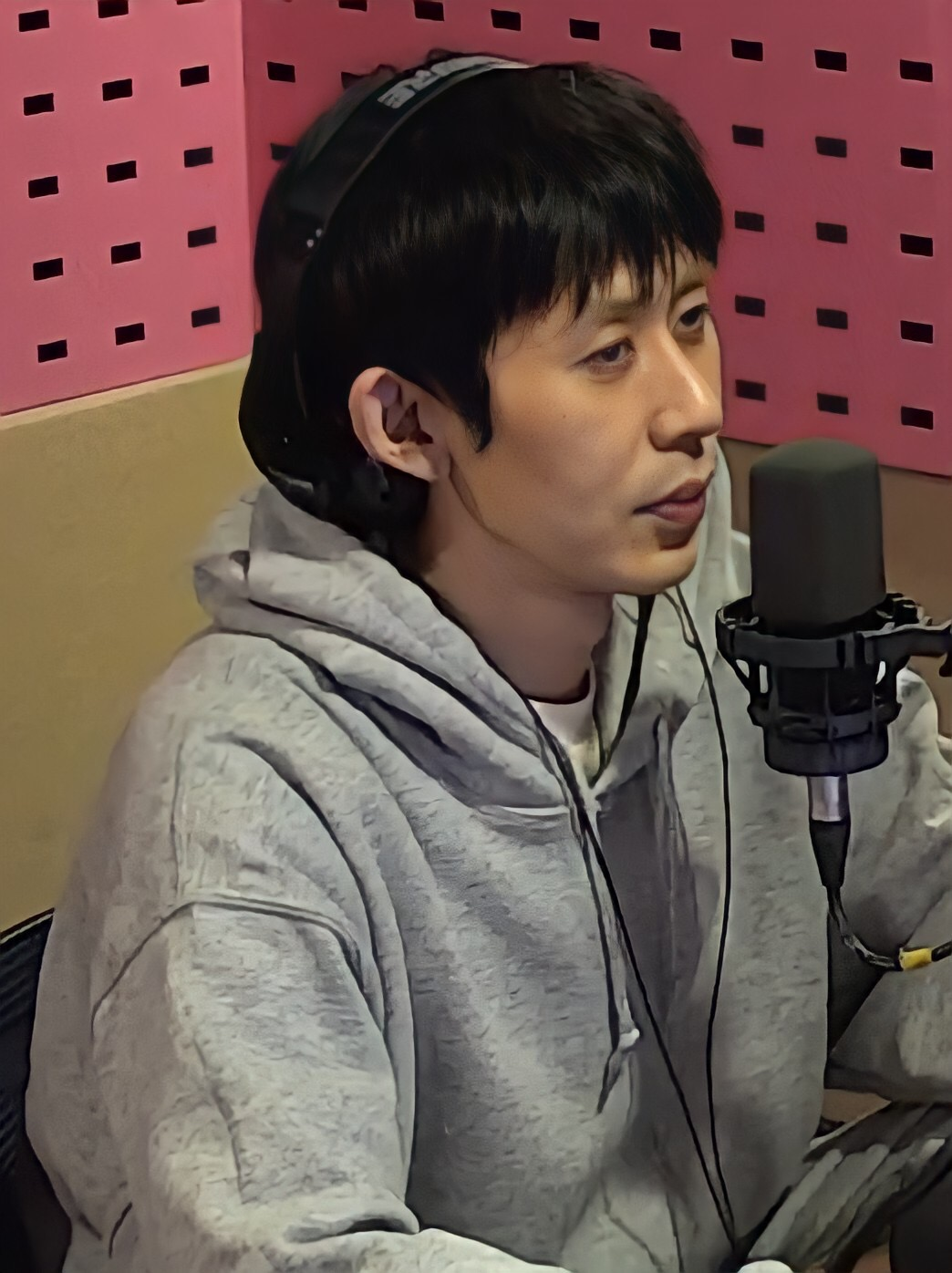
- Code Kunst on February 27, 2020

Background information
- Born: Jo Sung-woo; December 18, 1989 (age 36); Yeonsu, Incheon, South Korea
- Genres: Hip-hop
- Occupations: music producer; composer
- Years active: 2013–present
- Label: duover
- Member of: Legit Goons
- Website: aomgofficial.com/codekunst

Korean name
- Hangul: 조성우
- RR: Jo Seongu
- MR: Cho Sŏngu

Jo Sung-woo (Korean: 조성우; born December 18, 1989), better known by his stage name Code Kunst (코드 쿤스트), is a South Korean composer and music producer. In 2015, he released his second studio album Crumple and joined Highgrnd. In 2017, he released his third studio album Muggles' Mansion. In 2018, he signed to AOMG and appeared as a judge alongside Paloalto on Show Me the Money 777. He released his fourth studio album People in 2020 and won Producer of the Year at the Korean Hip-hop Awards in 2021. In 2023, he released his fifth studio album Remember Archive.

== Early life and education ==
Jo Sung-woo was born on December 18, 1989, in Yeonsu, Incheon. He became interested in hip hop after listening to Nas' "Doo Rags". He decided to pursue a career in music after serving in the military. He studied design at Dong-ah Institute of Media and Arts, but got expelled.

The word "Kunst" means "Art" in German, so the stage name Code Kunst has a meaning of "the music I produced will become arts."

== Career ==
=== 2013–2017: Signing to Highgrnd ===
In 2013, Code Kunst released his debut single "Lemonade", starting his music career relatively late in his life. Upon being asked whether he was nervous about his career in the beginning, he said, "At first, I wasn't nervous because in the beginning I was really going to do music as a hobby. I was already somewhat old and I didn't have the skills at first, but I felt that I needed to hurry. I'm too late, I'm too late... this thought was so strong. So I made the decision to spend the years I was 24 and 25 years old, 2 years--2 years, let me use that as if it were 4 years."

In April 2015, he released his second studio album Crumple, which was later nominated for Best Rap Album at the Korean Music Awards. In September 2015, Code Kunst joined the label HIGHGRND under YG Entertainment due to the impact of Tablo. He specifically cited Tablo's willingness to work together in person, such as on tracks like "Hood" featuring Tablo and Joey Bada$$, made him believe HIGHGRND was a good label for him. He released his third album Muggles' Mansion in February 2017, which received critical acclaim.

=== 2018–2023: Signing to AOMG ===
Code Kunst left HIGHGRND and joined AOMG in June 2018. In September 2018, he officially appeared in the Korean Hip-Hop survival show Show Me the Money 777 as one of the judges. "Good Day", a song he composed on the show, received positive reviews from critics. Loopy and Kid Milli from his team won second and third place in Show Me the Money 777.

In 2019, Code Kunst, along with Jay Park, Simon Dominic, Woo Won-jae, and Gray, appeared as judges on the audition program Signhere started by Korean Hip-hop label AOMG and MBN. In the same year, he appeared in another Hip-hop reality survival program High School Rapper 3. He was in the same team with The Quiett. Together they produced "Go High" (feat. Changmo, Woo Won-jae), sang by female rapper Lee Young-ji, who became the final winner to the show.

Code Kunst released his fourth studio album People in 2020. In the same year, he was announced as a producer for 'Show Me the Money 9' along with Paloalto as a team. In 2021, he won Producer of the Year at the Korean Hip-hop Awards. He then appeared as a winning producer for Show Me the Money 10 along with Gaeko of the rap group Dynamic Duo.

In 2023, he released his fifth studio album Remember Archive.

=== 2024–present ===
On May 31, 2024, it was announced that Code Kunst co-founded the independent label "duover" with Gray and Woo Won-jae, with the three artists serving as co-CEOs and former AOMG planning and production director Hwang A-ram joining as general director.

=== Television ===
Jo has appeared on I Live Alone as a regular cast since 2022. For his appearance on the show, he won the Rookie Award in 2022 and Popularity Award in 2023 at the MBC Entertainment Awards.

In March 2024, Jo was announced as one of the panelists for South Korean dating reality show, My Sibling's Romance.

== Artistry ==
Code Kunst said that looking at his mother's paintings while growing up has greatly influenced and aided him in visualizing music. Additionally, in an interview-style conversation with fellow AOMG member Punchnello, he has said that he draws musical inspiration from the simple and common experiences of everyday people which he also had before signing with larger labels (including "financially troubling situations and the kinds of things that happen in such situations"). As a result, he thought signing with a label too early might hinder his ability to experience the things regular people go through in their mid-20s. For similar reasons, he had decided to name his 2017 album, "Muggles' Mansion." Specifically he has said that the world "muggles" has two meanings to him, one which means very common and one that does not. For the album he wanted to "tell common stories with sources that reflect myself, yet includes sounds which aren't so common."

He adds a lot of vocal chopping in his music which became one of his unique music styles. Rolling Stone India commented that "he takes deep dives into old-school blues, rock, soul and hip-hop, tying it all neatly together with his signature vocal chopping techniques and flawless loops of instrumentals."

He cited Mac Miller as his biggest influence.

== Philanthropy ==
In 2020, Code Kunst donated to the Official George Floyd Memorial Fund, stating that Black music made a big impact on his life.

== Personal life ==
Code Kunst has two cats named Panda and Sheero.

== Filmography ==
=== Television shows ===
Year	Title	Role	Notes	Ref.
2018	Show Me the Money 777	Judge and producer		
2019	Signhere	Judge and producer		
2019	High School Rapper 3	Judge and producer		
2020	King of Mask Singer	Contestant		
2020	Show Me the Money 9	Judge and producer		
2021	Show Me the Money 10	Judge and producer		
2022–present	I Live Alone	Regular cast		
2023	My Friends Are Smarter Than Me	Host		
2023	Sing Again	Judge	Season 3	
2024	My Sibling's Romance	Host		
2025	Good Day	Cast member		

=== Web shows ===
Year	Title	Role	Notes	Ref.
2022	Change Days	Host	Season 2	
2022	Witch Hunt 2022	Host		

=== Music video appearances ===
Year	Song Title	Artist	Ref.
2021	"Lipstick"	Lee Hi (feat. Yoon Mirae)	

== Discography ==
=== Studio albums ===
Title	Album details	Peak chart positions	Sales
Title	Album details	KOR	Sales
Novel	Released: April 7, 2014; Label: Luminant Entertainment; Formats: CD, digital download	—	—N/a
Crumple	Released: April 28, 2015; Label: Luminant Entertainment; Formats: CD, digital download	34	KOR: 864
Muggles' Mansion	Released: February 28, 2017; Label: HIGHGRND, Genie Music; Formats: CD, digital download	26	KOR: 1,231
People	Released: April 2, 2020; Label: AOMG, Kakao M; Formats: CD, digital download, streaming	10	KOR: 6,466
Remember Archive	Released: March 16, 2023; Label: AOMG; Format: CD, Digital download	19	KOR: 12,784
"—" denotes releases that did not chart.

=== Extended plays ===
Title	EP details
Hear Things	Released: June 28, 2013; Label: Genuine Music; Formats: CD, digital download

=== Singles ===
Title	Year	Peak chart positions	Album
Title	Year	KOR	Album
"Lemonade" feat. Blnk-Time	2013	—	Hear Things
"1-2" feat. C Jamm	2013	—	Hear Things
"Betting" feat. Don Mills	2014	—	Novel
"Edison" (에디슨) feat. Nucksal	2015	—	Crumple
"Golden Cow" feat. C Jamm and DJ SQ	2015	—	Crumple
"Hood" feat. Tablo and Joey Badass	2015	—	Non-album single
"Parachute" feat. Oh Hyuk and Dok2	2015	24	Muggle's Mansion
"Beside Me" feat. BewhY, YDG and Suran	2016	92	Muggle's Mansion
"Fire Water" feat. G.Soul and Tablo	2017	—	Muggle's Mansion
"Rain Bird" feat. Colde and Tablo	2018	—	Non-album singles
"Bless" feat. Loco and Woo Won-jae	2018	—	Non-album singles
"XI" feat. Lee Hi	2019	199	Non-album singles
"Too Late" feat. JMSN	2019	—	Non-album singles
"Treat Her Better" feat. Niia	2019	—	All About Us
"Joke!" Feat. C Jamm and Simon Dominic	2020	—	People
"Knock" feat. Baek Ye-rin	2020	—	People
"Flower" (꽃) feat. Jay Park, Woo and Giriboy	2020	140	People
"For the Gone" (사라진 모든 것들에게) with Choi Jung-hoon and Simon Dominic	2020	106	Non-album singles
"You Get Off"	2021	—	Non-album singles
"Cheers" (치열) with Lee Chan-hyuk, Colde and Sogumm	2021	—	Non-album singles
"Take Me" with Meenoi	2022	—	Non-album singles
"The Ball Is Round" with Woo Won-jae and Jeon So-yeon	2022	—	Non-album singles
"Bad Bad" (feat. Tabber and Jay Park)	2023	—	Remember Archive
"55" (feat. Baek Ye-rin and Wendy)	2023	99	Remember Archive
"Jumper" (feat. Gaeko and Mino)	2023	102	Remember Archive
"Circle" (feat. Crush)	2023	183	Remember Archive
"—" denotes releases that did not chart.

== Awards and nominations ==
Award	Year	Nominee	Category	Result	Ref.
Blue Dragon Series Awards	2024	My Sibling's Romance	Best Male Entertainer	Nominated	
Brand Customer Loyalty Awards	2023	Himself	Multitainer – Male	Won	
Korean Hip-hop Awards	2018	Muggles' Mansion	Hip-hop Album of the Year	Nominated	
Korean Hip-hop Awards	2018	Himself	Producer of the Year	Nominated	
Korean Hip-hop Awards	2019	Himself	Producer of the Year	Nominated	
Korean Hip-hop Awards	2021	Himself	Producer of the Year	Won	
Korean Hip-hop Awards	2022	Himself	Producer of the Year	Nominated	
Korean Hip-hop Awards	2024	Himself	Producer of the Year	Nominated	
Korean Music Awards	2016	Crumple	Best Rap Album	Nominated	
MBC Entertainment Awards	2022	Himself	Rookie Award – Male	Won	
MBC Entertainment Awards	2023	Himself	Popularity Award – Reality	Won	
