= Lee Hi =

South Korean singer and songwriter (born 1996)

LeeHi
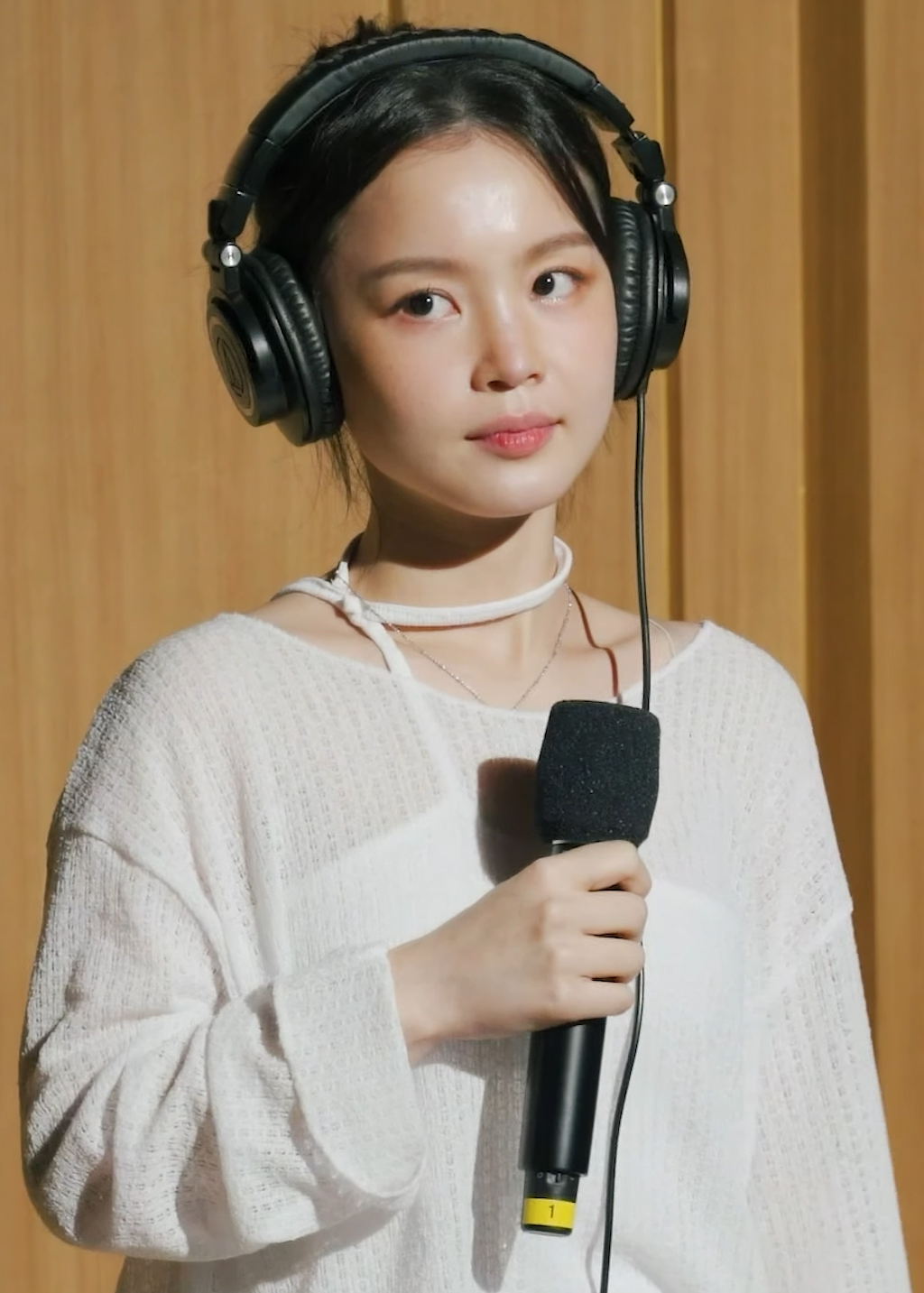
- Lee performing for SBS Radio in September 2021
- Born: Lee Ha-yi; September 23, 1996 (age 30); Bucheon, Gyeonggi, South Korea
- Education: School of Performing Arts Seoul
- Occupations: Singer; songwriter
- Musical career
- Genres: K-pop; R&B; soul; blues
- Instrument: Vocals
- Years active: 2012–present
- Labels: YG; AOMG; Duover; 808 Hi Recordings
- Formerly of: Hi Suhyun

Korean name
- Hangul: 이하이
- Hanja: 李遐怡
- RR: I Hai
- MR: I Hai

Signature
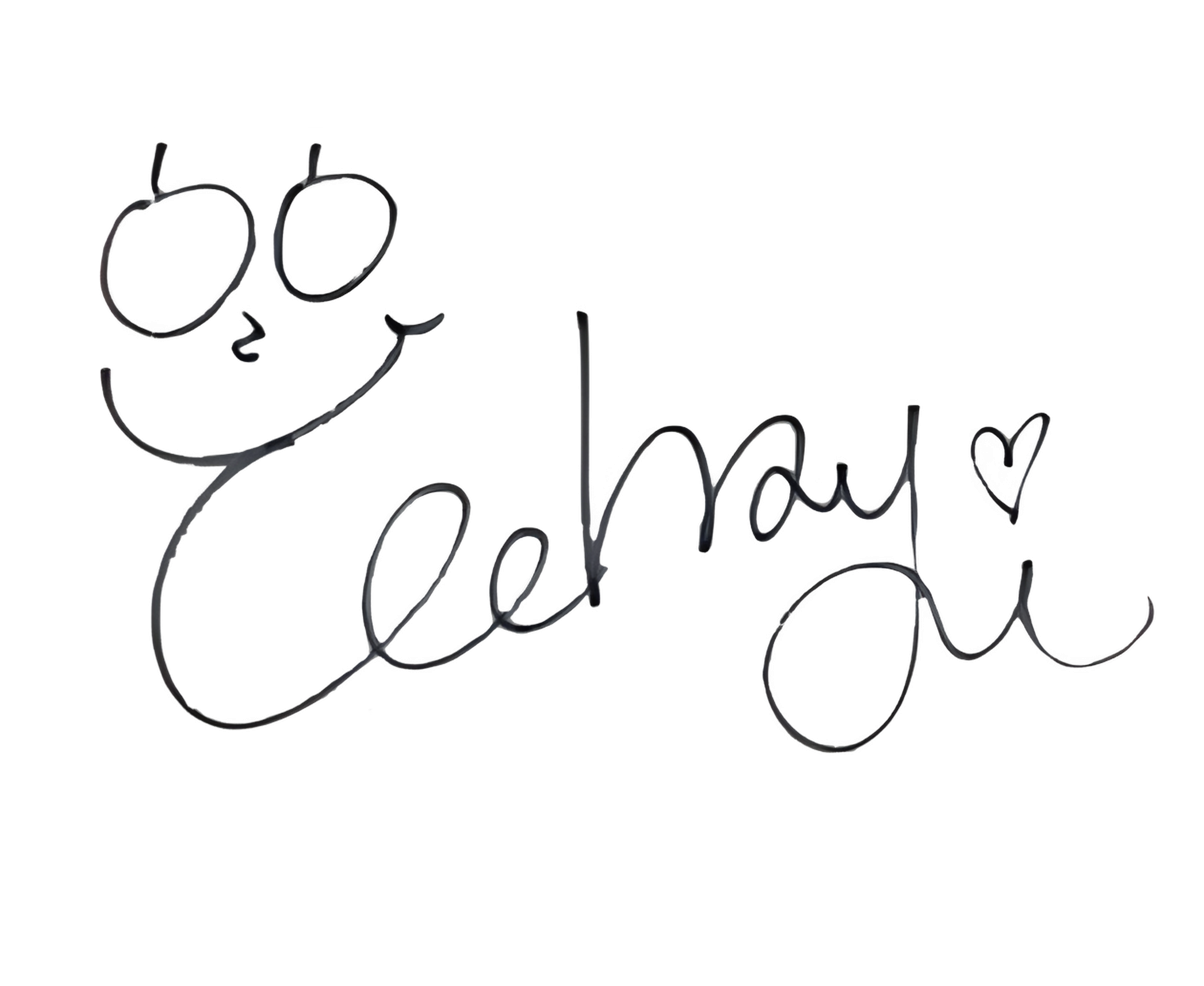

Lee Ha-yi (Korean: 이하이; born September 23, 1996), known by her stage name LeeHi, is a South Korean singer and songwriter.

She first garnered attention as the runner-up of the first season of K-pop Star. She debuted with the single "1, 2, 3, 4" on October 28, 2012, and reached number one with first week sales of 667,549 downloads. Her first full-length album First Love was released in two parts: the first on 7 March 2013 and the second on 28 March 2013. Her second full-length album Seoulite, released 20 April 2016, featured chart-topping "all-kill" single "Breathe", written by Kim Jong-hyun of SHINee.

In 2020, she signed to hip-hop and R&B record label AOMG, where she released the studio album 4 Only (2021), including hit lead single "Only". As of March 2026, she is the co-founder of 808 Hi Recordings with rapper Dok2.

== Early life ==
Lee Ha-yi was born on 23 September 1996, in Bucheon, Gyeonggi, South Korea. She has one older sister.

== Career ==
=== 2011–2015: Career beginnings and Hi Suhyun ===
In December 2011, Lee auditioned for SBS reality survival program K-pop Star, where she finished as runner-up behind Park Ji-min. Soon after she was signed to YG Entertainment by Yang Hyun-suk. Ahead of her debut, Lee was featured on labelmate Epik High's single "It's Cold", which was released on 8 October 2012.

On 24 October, YG Entertainment announced Lee would be debuting as a solo artist under the stage name 'LeeHi' with digital single "1, 2, 3, 4" on 28 October. Lee's first music show appearance was on SBS' Inkigayo on 4 November 2012, soon after claiming her first music show win on 8 November 2012 through Mnet's M Countdown. The song charted number one on the monthly Gaon Digital Chart for November, thus earning her the Song of the Year - November award from Gaon Chart K-Pop Awards. Following success of debut single "1, 2, 3, 4", Lee released a second digital single written by Park Jin-young titled "Scarecrow" on 22 November.

In spring 2013, YGE revealed Lee's debut album First Love would be released digitally on 7 March 2013 consisting of five tracks, including lead single "It's Over", and a physical release on 28 March with ten tracks including lead single "Rose". Promotions began with first stage at SBS' K-pop Star 2 on March 10. In December 2013, it was revealed LeeHi and 2NE1's Park Bom would debut as the sub-unit BOM&HI, releasing the digital single "All I Want For Christmas Is You" on 20 December 2013. In November 2014, Lee and Akdong Musician's Lee Su-hyun formed the sub-unit Hi Suhyun and released digital single "I'm Different" featuring iKon's Bobby. The duo's first stage was at SBS' Inkigayo on 16 November, following their first win on 23 November.

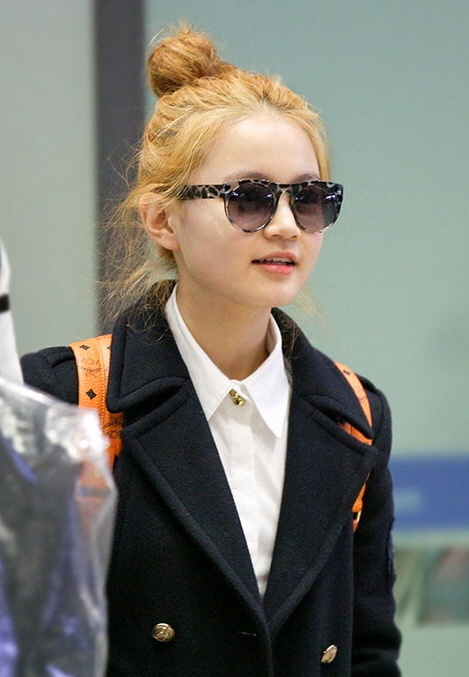
LeeHi at Incheon Airport on January 18, 2013

=== 2016–2018: Career breakthrough ===
On 9 March 2016, Lee released half-album Seoulite produced through the YGE sublabel HIGHGRND established by Epik High. Seoulite saw the success of lead singles "Hold My Hand" and "Breathe", the latter of which was written by SHINee's Kim Jong-hyun. "Breathe" won Lee the Digital Bonsang award at the 31st Golden Disk Awards. Lee began promotions for both singles on Mnet's M! Countdown on 10 March. On 20 April, the second half of Seoulite was released, now a studio album, featuring lead single "My Star".

On 28 May 2016, Lee featured on Gill's single "Refrigerator" alongside Verbal Jint. On 19 September, SBS drama Moon Lovers: Scarlet Heart Ryeo released Epik High and Lee's soundtrack "Can You Hear My Heart", following Lee's soundtrack "My Love" on October 3. On 31 December, Lee appeared on MBC's Infinite Challenge Hip-hop & History special as a featured guest for Yoo Jae-suk and Dok2's stage.

On 28 February 2017, Lee featured on Code Kunst's single "X" from his studio album Muggles Mansion. On March 28, Lee featured on Dok2's single "On & On" off studio album Reborn, for which she participated in writing and composing. On 9 March 2017, Lee teamed up with MAC for the Future Forward Collection, creating a special matte red lipstick. Later that year, Lee held a fansign event at Lotte World in Seoul and a small concert event in collaboration with the brand. On 17–18 June, SBS' K-pop Star held a 'K-pop Star and Friends' concert, including performances by LeeHi and label-mate AKMU. On 20 August, Lee appeared on SBS' Party People where she shared that she had suffered from minor panic attacks, inspiring the creation and writing of her 2016 hit single "Breathe". On 23 October, Lee featured on Epik High's single "Here Come the Regrets" off studio album We've Done Something Wonderful.

On 21 March 2018, Lee's self-titled Japanese debut album was released, beginning her first Japan tour. On 19 October, Lee collaborated with the film Bohemian Rhapsody and released a cover soundtrack of Queen's "Bohemian Rhapsody".

=== 2019–2025: Continued success and label changes ===
On 15 January 2019, Lee released digital single "XI" with Code Kunst, the track was sung live for the first time on MBC Dreaming Radio.

LeeHi made a comeback with her EP 24°C on 30 May 2019. The lead single, "No One" (featuring former iKON member B.I), topped all charts in South Korea, including Melon, Genie and Mnet. Among the tracks, she released the self-written and produced song "20Min". Lee received her first music show win for single "No One" through Mnet's M Countdown on 6 June.

On 31 December 2019, it was announced that Lee's contract with YG Entertainment had ended and she did not renew.

In June 2020, Lee joined as a cast member for the fourth installment of JTBC show Begin Again from episode 4 to 6.

On 22 July 2020, AOMG revealed that they had signed an exclusive contract with LeeHi and released her comeback single "Holo". "Holo" peaked at number 7 on the Gaon Digital Chart and won R&B Track of the Year at the Korean Hip-hop Awards. On 9 September 2021, Lee released her third studio album 4 Only, including hit single "Only", charting on Gaon, Melon, Bugs, and more. In March 2022, "Only" won 'R&B Track of the Year' at the Korean Hip-hop Awards. On 24 May 2023, Lee featured on digital single "DO" by Padi. In March 2024, Lee chose not to renew her contract with AOMG and subsequently departed the label.

On 23 September 2024, Lee signed an exclusive contract with independent music label Duover, established by former AOMG labelmates Code Kunst, Gray, and Woo Won-jae, to manage her future activities. Video content of previously unreleased track "One Thing" was released on LeeHi's YouTube channel to celebrate her 28th birthday.

=== 2026–present: Establishment of 808 Hi Recordings ===
In March 2026, Duover announced that LeeHi had departed the label.

In spring 2026, Lee revealed her years-long relationship with rapper Dok2 and the establishment of their co-founded label 808 Hi Recordings. The pair released their first collaboration under the label, digital single "You & Me", on 28 March 2026.

Lee held her first solo concert in eight years, HI-biscus Garden Live vol. 1, on 3 October 2026.

== Discography ==
Studio albums

- First Love (2013)
- Seoulite (2016)
- Lee Hi Japan Debut Album (2018)
- 4 Only (2021)

== Filmography ==
=== Television shows ===
Date	Title	Notes	Ref.
2011	K-pop Star	Contestant	
2017	Relationship Appeal	Cast member	
2017	King of Mask Singer	Contestant	
2020	Begin Again	Cast member (Season 4, Episodes 4–6)	

== Concerts and tours ==
- Lee Hi 1st Concert "Secret Live RE:HI" (2013)
- Lee Hi 1st Japan Tour (2018)
- Follow The Movement: AOMG World Tour 2023 (2023; with Simon Dominic, Loco, Gray, and Yugyeom)
- HI-biscus Garden Live vol. 1 (2026)

== Awards and nominations ==
Name of the award ceremony, year presented, edition, category, nominee of the award, and the result of the nomination
Award ceremony	Year	Category	Nominee/Work	Result	Ref.
Asia Artist Awards	2021	Female Solo Singer Popularity Award	LeeHi	Nominated	
Cyworld Digital Music Awards	2012	Song of the Month – October	"It's Cold (춥다)" (Epik High featuring LeeHi)	Won	
Gaon Chart Music Awards	2012	Song of the Year – November	"1, 2, 3, 4"	Won	
Gaon Chart Music Awards	2016	Song of the Year – March	"Breathe"	Nominated	
Gaon Chart Music Awards	2020	Song of the Year – July	"Holo"	Nominated	
Genie Music Awards	2020	Best R&B/Soul Track	"Holo"	Won	
Golden Disc Awards	2012	Best Rookie Award	"1, 2, 3, 4"	Won	
Golden Disc Awards	2016	Digital Song Bonsang	"Breathe"	Won	
Golden Disc Awards	2020	Digital Song Bonsang	"Holo"	Nominated	
Golden Disc Awards	2020	Curaprox Popularity Award	LeeHi	Nominated	
Korean Hip-hop Awards	2021	R&B Track of the Year	"Holo"	Won	
Korean Hip-hop Awards	2022	R&B Track of the Year	"Only"	Won	
Korean Hip-hop Awards	2022	R&B Album of the Year	4 Only	Nominated	
Korean Music Awards	2013	Best R&B Soul Song	"1, 2, 3, 4"	Nominated	
Korean Music Awards	2014	Female Musician of the Year – Netizen Vote	LeeHi	Won	
Korean Music Awards	2014	Best R&B Soul Album	First Love	Nominated	
Korean Music Awards	2014	Best R&B Soul Song	"It's Over"	Nominated	
Korean Music Awards	2022	Best R&B Soul Song	"H.K.S.T"	Nominated	
Melon Music Awards	2016	Top 10 Artist	LeeHi	Nominated	
Melon Music Awards	2016	Best R&B / Soul Song	"Breathe"	Nominated	
Mnet Asian Music Awards	2013	Best New Female Artist	Lee Hi	Nominated	
Mnet Asian Music Awards	2013	Best Vocal Performance – Female	"1, 2, 3, 4"	Nominated	
Mnet Asian Music Awards	2016	Best Female Artist	LeeHi	Nominated	
Mnet Asian Music Awards	2020	Worldwide Fans' Choice Top 10	LeeHi	Nominated	
Mnet Asian Music Awards	2020	Best Hip Hop & Urban Music	"Holo"	Nominated	
Seoul Music Awards	2012	New Artist Award	"1, 2, 3, 4"	Won	
Seoul Music Awards	2020	Best R&B Hip-Hop Award	"Holo"	Nominated	
World Music Awards	2012	World's Best Song	"1, 2, 3, 4"	Nominated	
World Music Awards	2012	World's Best Video	"1, 2, 3, 4"	Nominated	
