= 2018 Asian Games opening ceremony =

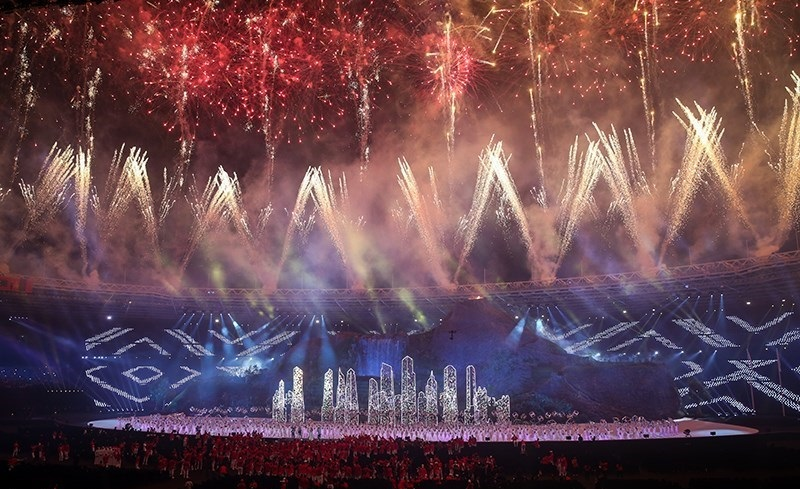
- The fireworks set off after the artistic segment
- Date: 18 August 2018; 8 years ago
- Time: 19:00 – 21:25 WIB (UTC+7)
- Location: Jakarta, Indonesia; 6°13′7″S 106°48′9″E
- Filmed by: NET. IGBS
- Footage: Opening Ceremony of 18th Asian Games Jakarta – Palembang 2018 on YouTube

The opening ceremony of the 2018 Asian Games took place on Saturday, 18 August 2018, at the Gelora Bung Karno Main Stadium in Jakarta, Indonesia. The event commenced at 19:00 Indonesia Western Time (UTC+7) and ended at 21:25 local time. Wishnutama Kusubandio (then CEO of Indonesian TV network NET.) was the creative director of the ceremony. The ceremony featured a stage designed as a 26-meter-high mountain with a waterfall. It weighed 600 tons, was 120 meters long and 30 meters wide, and included a display of Indonesian plants and flowers, as well as a mock volcano. The volcano symbolized Indonesia's location in the "Ring of Fire" surrounding the Pacific Ocean. Host event broadcasting company International Games Broadcast Services (IGBS) filmed the televised coverage of the ceremony live internationally.

== Proceedings ==
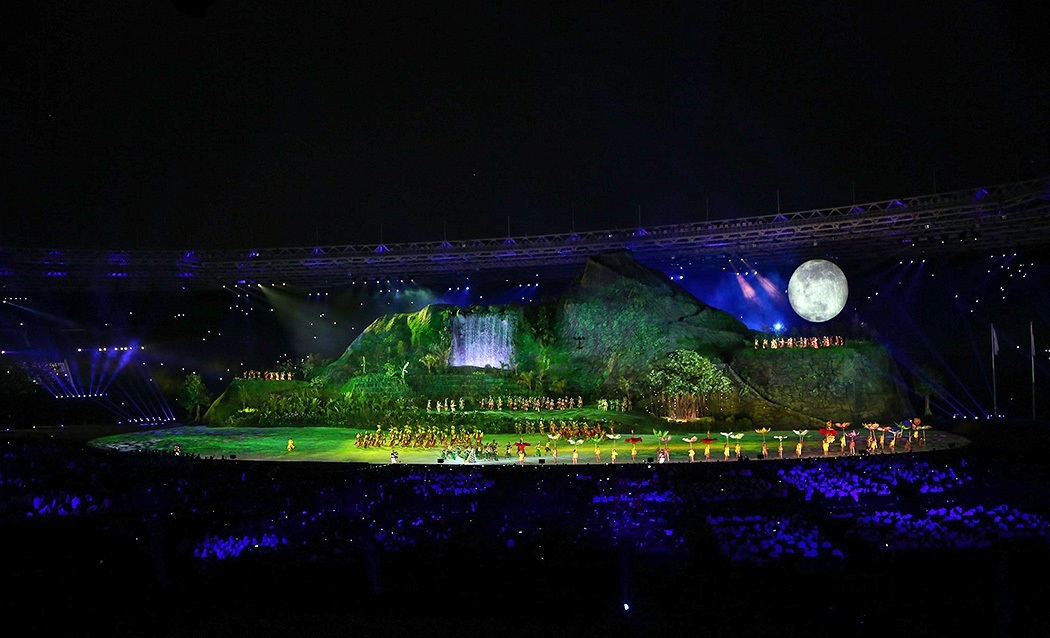
Stadium during the ceremony

=== Prelude ===
Before the ceremony commenced, footage of the President of Indonesia, Joko Widodo, leaving Bogor Palace for Gelora Bung Karno Stadium in a motorcade, was shown. When the motorcade was blocked by a parade of Indonesian supporters, the President exited his car, put on a black helmet and rode a Yamaha FZ1 to escape the traffic jam. After performing some stunt maneuvers and helping a group of students and a teacher to cross the road, he was joined by a motorcycle escort and approached the stadium. As the first part of the footage ended, a motorcyclist dressed as the President entered the stadium and headed to the basement. The second part of footage then showed President Widodo riding the motorcycle before reaching an elevator, at which point the real President entered the VVIP seating area.

It was suggested that the motorcyclist who entered the stadium was a stunt double: unlike the President, the motorcyclist did not wear a ring on the left hand. After the games' closing ceremony, Thai stuntman Withithep Komolhiran (a.k.a. Suddum So) revealed himself on Instagram to be the President's stunt double in the filmed segments. He initially revealed his identity on Instagram after the opening ceremony, but the original post was later deleted. It is unclear whether the motorist performed live in the stadium was the same stuntman or not.

=== Countdown ===
A ten-to-zero city central business district metropolitan countdown video was then shown featuring spots in Jakarta; the last two was the Jakarta's National Monument and the Gelora Bung Karno Stadium.

=== Main event ===
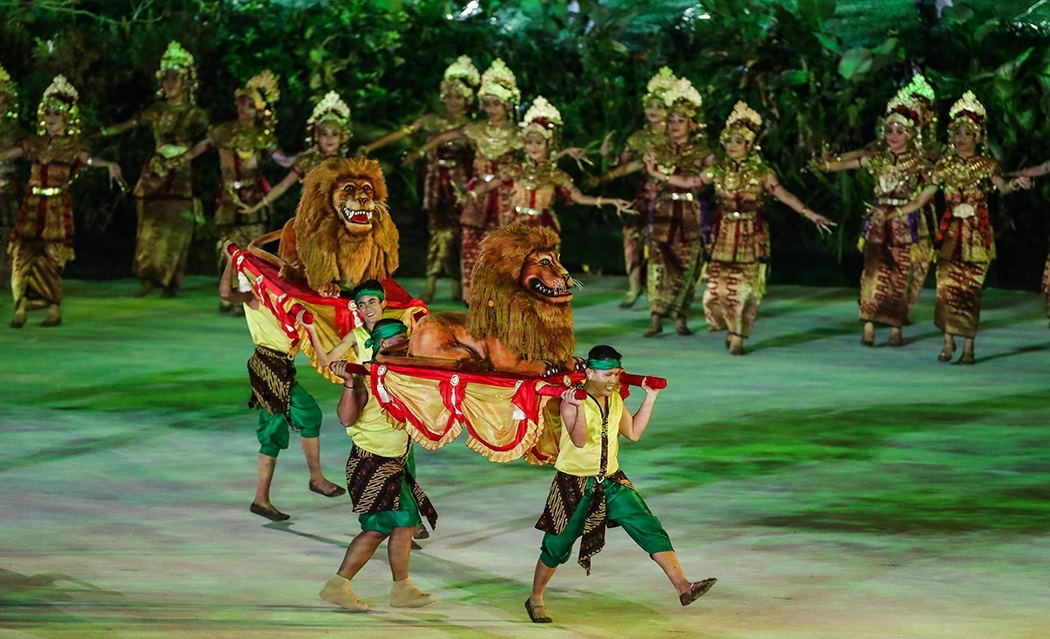
Performance of Sisingaan dance during the ceremony

After that, 1,600 high school dancers from 18 senior high schools across Jakarta performed the Ratoh Jaroe dance, a traditional dance similar to Saman dance from Aceh, the westernmost province of Indonesia. As their performance progresses, they changed the colors of their costumes and forming different patterns which evolved into the flag of Indonesia in the end. The dance was choreographed by renowned singer and dancer Denny Malik.

During the Parade of Nations, North Korean and South Korean teams marched together under one unified flag of Korea. As per tradition, Indonesia as the host nation entered last. The "Ocean Corridor Music" was used throughout the 40-minute long segment.

The only dangdut song of the album, "Meraih Bintang", was chosen as the theme song for the 2018 Asian Games. It was written by Pay and sung by popular dangdut singer Via Vallen. She performed the song after all the athletes participated in the parade took their seat.

The ceremony observed a moment of silence to remember the victims of the recent Lombok earthquake right after the Indonesian flag was raised by the Paskibraka youth group troop. The troop comprised 70 students with 17 people as guides, eight people as flag bearers and 45 people as guards, which represents Indonesia’s Independence Day, 17 August 1945. After speeches from the Organizing Committee chairman Erick Thohir and president Ahmad Al-Fahad Al-Ahmed Al-Sabah of the Olympic Council of Asia, President Widodo officially opened the games.

"In the name of all the people of Indonesia, we are proud, we are honored, by getting special guests from 45 countries. In the 18th Asian Games, we, the nations of Asia, want to show that we are brothers and sisters, we are united, we want to achieve. And, with saying Bi-smi llāhi r-raḥmāni r-raḥīm, the 18th Asian Games in 2018, I declare [it] open!" – Joko Widodo, President of the Republic of Indonesia, declaring the games open in Indonesian.

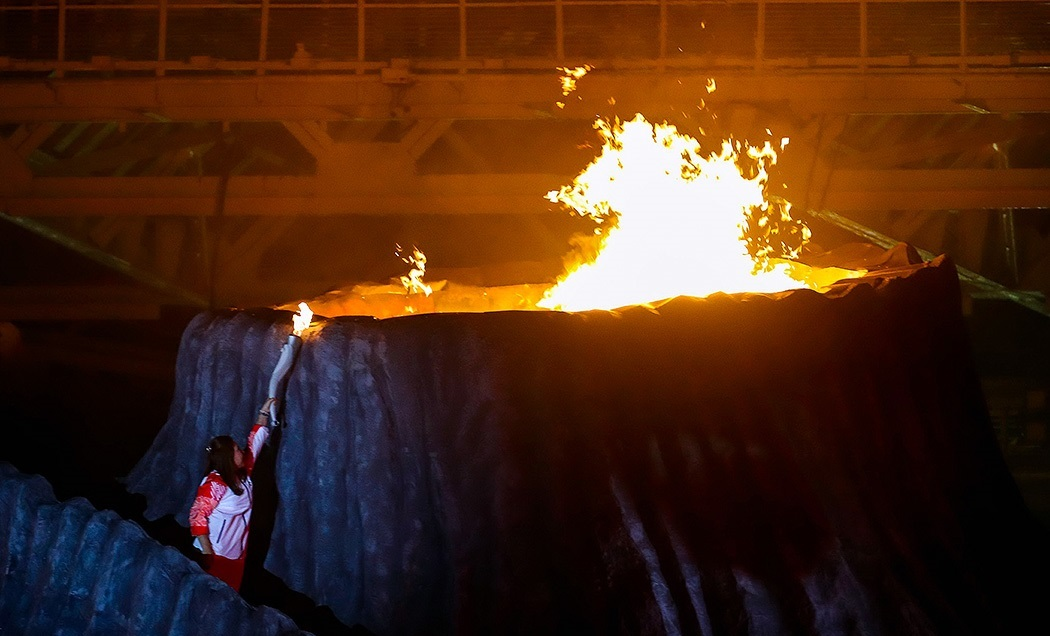
Susi Susanti, Indonesia's first ever Olympic gold medalist, lit the flame on the crater.

Eight former athletes, who all had participated in the Summer Olympic Games, carried the OCA flag which was raised by the aforementioned troop to the short version of the Olympic Council of Asia hymn. The former athletes were three badminton Olympic gold medalists, all in men's doubles; Christian Hadinata (1972 – albeit listed as 1978 Asian Games gold medalist since the 1972 event was not an official Olympic event), Candra Wijaya (2000), and Markis Kido (2008), two of the three athletes who won silver in 1988 women's team archery event – Indonesia's first ever Olympic medal; Lilies Handayani and Kusuma Wardhani, bronze medalist in 2000 Olympics women's 48 kg weightlifting Sri Indriyani, and two Asian Games medalists who did not win any medals in the Olympics; Lely Sampurno (silver medalist on 50 metre pistol in the 1962 shooting event, participated on 25 metre pistol event in 1984) and Suharyadi (gold medalist on mixed doubles in the 1990 tennis event, participated on men's singles in 1984 and men's doubles in 1988 and 1992). After the raising, Indonesian basketball player Arki Dikania Wisnu and badminton umpire Wahyana read the athlete's and referee's oath.

Soon afterwards was the creative segments, divided into five parts: Water, Earth, Wind, Fire, and Energy of Asia. The water, earth, wind and fire depict the natural beauty of Indonesia and also the country's courage and competitive spirit, while Energy of Asia, the final segment named after the games motto, was about how future generations will help build Indonesia into a leader of tomorrow while remembering their guiding principles of respect and equality.

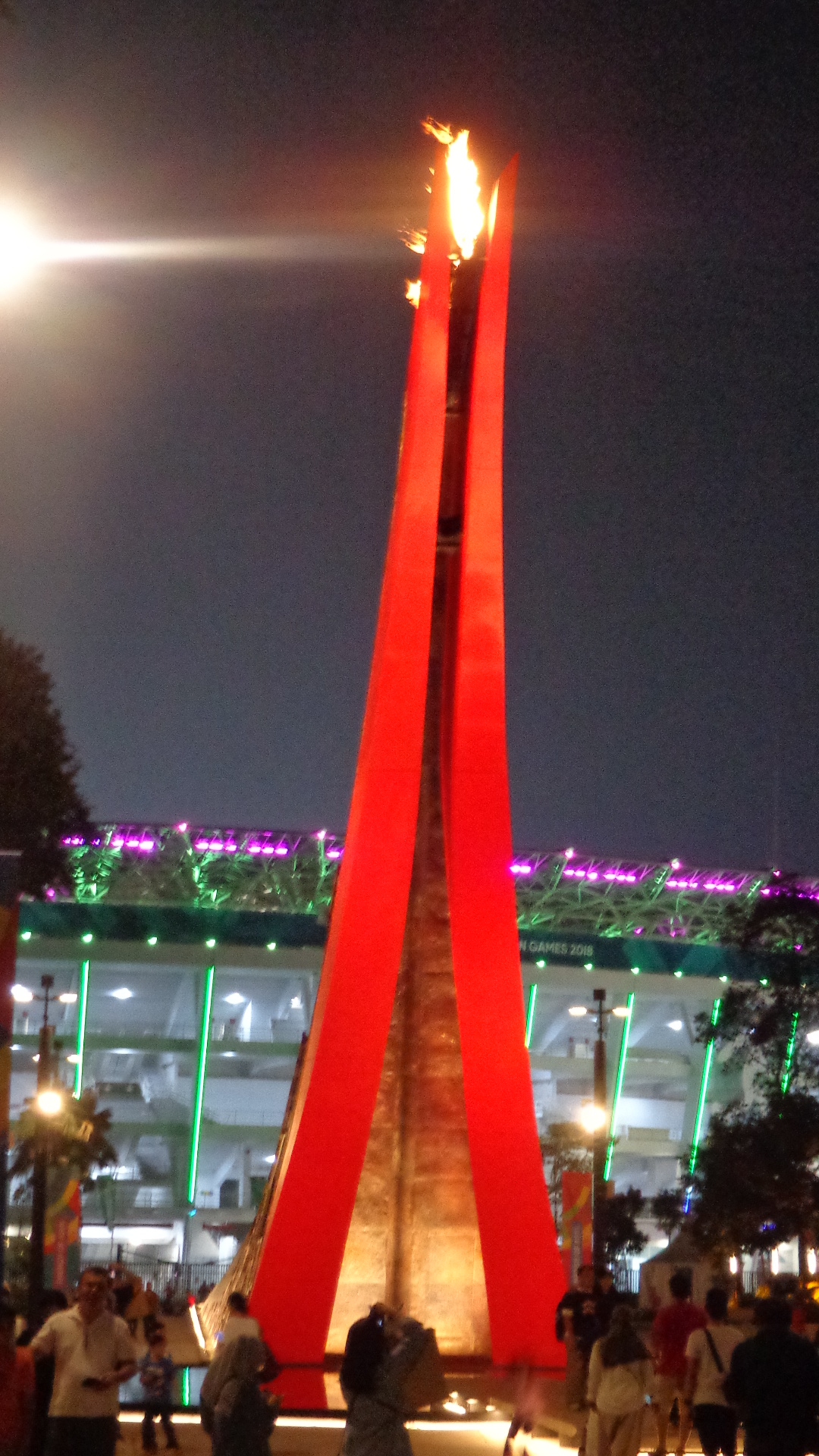
The new cauldron of the GBK carried the Asian Games flame

During the Fire segment, there were Balinese-clad dancers carrying drums and some carried two-end torches. They formed a formation to make way for the final torch relay. The games torch was relayed by Indonesia's former Asian Games gold medalists; Lanny Gumulya (women's 3 metres springboard diving in 1962), Arief Taufan Syamsuddin (men's kumite 60 kg karate in 1998), Yustedjo Tarik (men's singles tennis in 1982), Supriyati Sutono (women's 5000 metres athletics in 1998), and Oka Sulaksana (men's mistral heavy sailing in 2002). Indonesia's first Olympic gold medalist Susi Susanti – who won the coveted title in the 1992 badminton women's singles – became the final bearer and lit the volcano's crater. It was followed by aerial and ground fireworks bursts which ended on the actual cauldron located on the southeast of the stadium; the flame itself lit up before the ground fireworks reach the end of the cauldron. The lit-up was followed by aerial fireworks bursts and a "Set Your Soul on Fire" song which sung by some singers, including Indonesian gospel singer Sidney Mohede.

The transition from the four elements segment to the "Energy of Asia" segment was filled by Indonesian-born French singer Anggun singing "Pemuda", a 1979 song written by Candra Darusman of Chaseiro band, who is the younger brother of politician Marzuki Darusman. He was also present during the ceremony. After some modern dances, the ceremony was concluded with the performance of the games' first-released official song "Bright as the Sun" sung by 4 of the song's artists; Ariel, Rian Ekky Pradipta, Sheryl Sheinafia, and Cakra Khan, complete with massive fireworks bursting from the stadium's roof.

== List of performers ==
Here is a list of artists and musicians who performed during the ceremony. All of them are Indonesians.

- Joey Alexander (performing "Gending Sriwijaya" and "Melati Suci" (lit. "Holy Jasmine")) with Putri Ayu)
- Anggun (performing "Pemuda" (lit. "Youth"))
- Ariel, Rian Ekky Pradipta, Sheryl Sheinafia, and Cakra Khan (performing "Bright as the Sun")
- Putri Ayu (performing "Melati Suci" with Joey Alexander)
- GAC (performing "Paris Barantai", "Ampar-ampar Pisang" and "Cik Cik Periuk")
- Edo Kondologit (performing "Apuse")
- Kamasean Matthews (performing "Si Patokaan")
- Raisa Andriana (performing "Zamrud Khatulistiwa")
- Rossa (performing "Si Jali-Jali" and "Manuk Dadali")
- Fatin Shidqia (performing "Sigulempong")
- Tulus featuring the Purwa Caraka Music Studio Children's Choir (performing "Indonesia Raya" (Indonesian National Anthem))
- Via Vallen (performing "Meraih Bintang" (lit. "Reach for the Stars"))
- Wizzy (performing "Padang Bulan" and "Lir Sa'alir")
- Rinni Wulandari (performing "Bolelebo")

== Parade of nations ==
All 44 contingents participated in the parade, the order begins with Afghanistan and ended with host Indonesia. Each contingent was led by a representative official that wore a bird-shaped Garuda costume while carrying each country’s name placard. The costume was designed by Dynand Fariz, founder of the annual Jember Fashion Carnaval.

== Notable guests ==
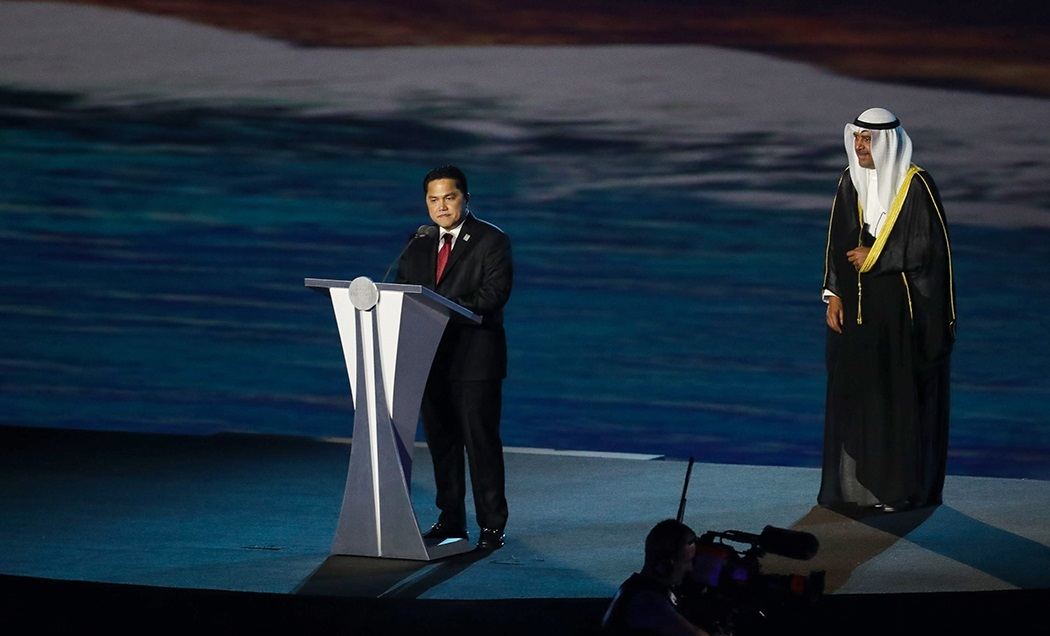
Indonesian Olympic Committee chairman Erick Thohir and Ahmed Al-Fahad Al-Ahmed Al-Sabah, president of the Olympic Council of Asia

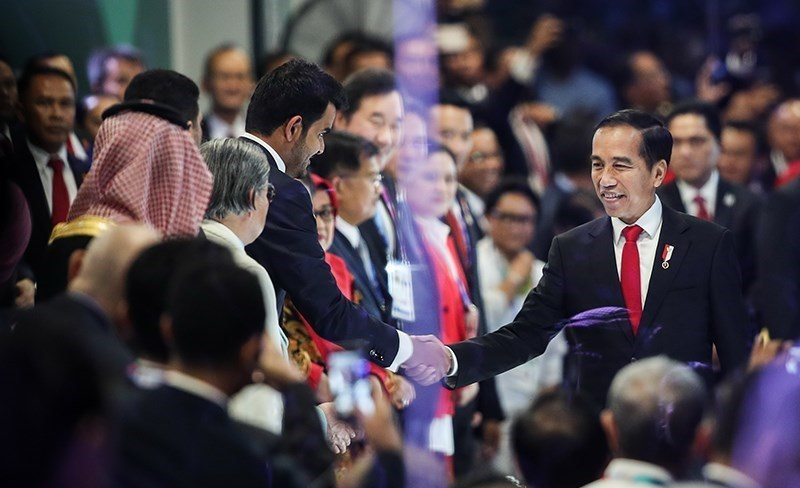
Indonesian President Joko Widodo shakes hand with Joann Al Thani, the Qatar Olympic Committee president.

=== Indonesians ===
- Joko Widodo, President of Indonesia
- Iriana, First Lady of Indonesia
- Jusuf Kalla, Vice President of Indonesia and Indonesia Asian Games Organizing Committee (INASGOC) steering committee chairman
- Mufidah Mi'ad Saad, Second Lady of Indonesia
- B. J. Habibie and Megawati Sukarnoputri, former Presidents (and previously Vice Presidents) of Indonesia
- Sinta Nuriyah, former First Lady of Indonesia
- Try Sutrisno and Boediono, former Vice Presidents of Indonesia
- Tuti Sutiawati and Herawati, former Second Ladies of Indonesia
- Imam Nahrawi, Youth and Sports Minister of Indonesia
- Puan Maharani, Coordinating Minister for Human Development and Cultural Affairs of Indonesia and INASGOC steering committee first vice chairwoman
- Tjahjo Kumolo, Home Affairs Minister of Indonesia
- Sri Mulyani Indrawati, Finance Minister of Indonesia
- Luhut Binsar Pandjaitan, Coordinating Minister for Maritime Affairs of Indonesia
- Airlangga Hartarto, Minister of Industry of Indonesia
- Enggartiasto Lukita, Trade Minister of Indonesia
- Wiranto, Coordinating Minister for Political, Legal, and Security Affairs of Indonesia
- Yasonna Laoly, Law and Human Rights Minister of Indonesia
- Ignasius Jonan, Energy and Mineral Resources Minister of Indonesia
- Nila Moeloek, Health Minister of Indonesia
- Rudiantara, Communication and Information Technology Minister of Indonesia
- Muhammad Hanif Dhakiri, Minister of Manpower of Indonesia
- Eko Putro Sandjojo, Minister of Village, Underdeveloped Regions, and Transmigration Affairs of Indonesia
- Pramono Anung, Cabinet Secretary of Indonesia
- Pratikno, State Secretary Minister of Indonesia
- Idrus Marham, Social Affairs Minister of Indonesia
- Moeldoko, Head of the Presidential Staff Office of Indonesia
- Hadi Tjahjanto, Commander of the Indonesian National Armed Forces
- Tito Karnavian, Chief of the Indonesian National Police
- Zulkifli Hasan, Speaker of the Congress of Indonesia
- Bambang Soesatyo, Speaker of the House of Representatives of Indonesia
- Oesman Sapta Odang, Speaker of the Senate of Indonesia
- Moermahadi Soerja Djanegara, chairman of the Audit Board of Indonesia
- Muhammad Hatta Ali, Chief Justice of the Supreme Court of Indonesia
- Anwar Usman, Chief Justice of the Constitutional Court of Indonesia
- Basaria Pandjaitan and Laode Muhammad Syarif, vice chairpersons of the Corruption Eradication Commission of Indonesia
- Triawan Munaf, head of the Creative Economy Agency of Indonesia
- Mohamad Oemar, head of the Vice-Presidential Secretariat of Indonesia
- Rita Subowo, Vice President of the Olympic Council of Asia for the 2018 Asian Games and 2021 Asian Youth Games
- Erick Thohir, INASGOC executive chairman and Indonesian Olympic Committee chairperson
- Anies Baswedan, Governor of Jakarta and INASGOC steering committee member
- Alex Noerdin, Governor of South Sumatra and INASGOC steering committee member
- Wahidin Halim, Governor of Banten and INASGOC steering committee member
- Mochamad Iriawan, Interim Governor of West Java and INASGOC steering committee member
- Ganjar Pranowo, Governor of Central Java
- Prasetyo Edi Marsudi, Speaker of Jakarta Regional House of Representatives
- Sukmawati Sukarnoputri and Meutia Hatta, daughters of first President Sukarno and first Vice President Mohammad Hatta

=== Foreign dignitaries ===
- Lee Nak-yeon, Prime Minister of South Korea
- Sun Chunlan, Vice Premier of the People's Republic of China on Education, Health, Sports, and Cultural Affairs
- Ri Ryong-nam, Vice Premier of North Korea
- Hideaki Ōmura, Governor of Aichi Prefecture, Japan
- Ahmed Al-Fahad Al-Ahmed Al-Sabah, president of the Olympic Council of Asia (OCA)
- Mikee Cojuangco-Jaworski, member of International Olympic Committee
- Wei Jizhong, Honorary Vice President for Life of the OCA
- Raja Randhir Singh, Honorary Vice President for Life of the OCA
- Timothy Fok, Vice President of the OCA and president of the Sports Federation and Olympic Committee of Hong Kong, China
- Christopher Chan Seng Heng, Vice President of the OCA for the 2009 Asian Youth Games
- Tsunekazu Takeda, Vice President of the OCA for the 2017 Asian Winter Games, president of the Japanese Olympic Committee, and the 2018 Asian Games Coordination Committee chairman
- Syed Arif Hasan, Vice President of the OCA and president of the Pakistan Olympic Association
- Majid Rashed, president of the Asian Paralympic Committee (APC)
- Tunku Imran, president of the Olympic Council of Malaysia
- Sa'ad bin Mohammed bin Said al Mardhouf al Sa'adi, Minister of Sports Affairs of Oman
- Joaan bin Hamad bin Khalifa Al Thani, president of the Qatar Olympic Committee
- Charouck Arirachakaran, general secretary of the National Olympic Committee of Thailand

== Reception ==
Joko Widodo's entrance drew comparisons to the London 2012 Summer Olympics opening ceremony's Happy and Glorious segment, which featured Daniel Craig (as James Bond) and Queen Elizabeth II making an impressive entrance with a helicopter, and the Rio 2016 Summer Olympics closing ceremony's Warming up! Tokyo 2020 segment, in which the Prime Minister of Japan Shinzō Abe made an appearance by "coming through" Warp Pipe from the Mario Bros. video game.

== See also ==
- 2018 Asian Games closing ceremony
- 2018 Asian Para Games opening and closing ceremonies
