= Superman Is Dead =

Indonesian punk rock band

- Origin: Bali, Indonesia
- Genre: Punk rock
- Years active: 1995–present
- Label: Sony Music Entertainment Indonesia
- Members: Boby Kool; Eka Rock; Jerinx
- Website: www.supermanisdead.net

Superman Is Dead (sometimes referred to simply as S.I.D) is a punk rock band hailing from Bali, formed in Kuta. The band has 3 members, namely Bobby Kool (lead vocal, guitar), Eka Rock (bass and backing vocal), Jerinx (drummer).

== The name Superman Is Dead ==
The name 'Superman Is Dead' started its evolution from Stone Temple Pilot's "Superman Silvergun". It was changed to "Superman Is Dead" because the band agreed that nobody is perfect.

SID was formed in 1995, drawn by their common interests of Green Day and NOFX. Their influences soon extended to the punk 'n roll genre, a la Supersuckers, Living End, and Social Distortion.

== Warped Tour 2009 ==
June – July 2009, Superman Is Dead held an American tour, playing 16 concerts in 16 cities. 11 of these shows were on the ‘Vans Warped Tour’ and the last 5 gigs were titled ‘From Bali With Rock’.

== Band Stage ==
- August 2002, Opening Act Hoobastank, Hard Rock Hotel, Kuta, Bali
- Superman Is Dead "Hot & Freaky People 2003" MTV Trax Magazine January 2003
- June

V Music Awards "The Most Famous Album Nominee, Pop Rock Category" for Kuta Rock City Album

- 2006, AMI Awards "The Best Rock Album Nominee" for Black Market Love Album
- 2006, "Superman Is Dead The Best Local Band" The Beat Awards.
- 20 the best Indonesian Album 2006 for The Black Market Love Album. Rolling Stone January 2007
- April 2007, SID Opening Act for American Punk Rock Band NOFX at Hard Rock Café, Kuta, Bali.
- Soundrenaline Sound of Change 2007 Jimbaran Bali, "Message of Change" Artist Nominee.
- 17 June 2007, Guest Star Artist "Final Gudang Garam Rock Competition" Jakarta
- October 2007, Superman Is Dead did an amazing Australian tour, 8 cities, 16 gigs, 33 days.
- 150 the Best Indonesian Album for Kuta Rock City Album. Rolling Stone, Special

Collectors’ Edition December 2007.

- 50 Hype Things in Indonesian Music Industrial 2008 for Superman Is Dead.
- Trax Music & Attitude Magazine Edition January 2008.
- 2008, Opening Act MXPX Jakarta.
- "SID as a New Icons of Bali". Yak Magazine Maret, April, May 2008.
- June 2009. Superman Is Dead American Tour. Played 11 gigs and cities in the 'Vans Warped Tour',

the last 5 gigs and cities were 'From Bali With Rock Tour'

== Controversy ==
Jerinx has opposed the land reclamation in Benoa Bay, Bali since 2014 because of its social impact. On 10 July 2018, Jerinx demanded President of Indonesia Joko Widodo to fulfil his promise back in 2015 to follow up on the Benoa Bay reclamation issue.

On 11 November 2018, Jerinx criticised dangdut singer Via Vallen in an Instagram post for covering the 2013 SID song "Sunset di Tanah Anarki" without permission. Vallen was said to have removed the meaning of the song. "VV [Via Vallen] should have learned to be a human, not just able to take. All this time singing SDTA [Sunset di Tanah Anarki] thousands of times, do our song's lyrics have no meaning for her? After being successful, what can you do to appreciate the work that brought you to a better place? With millions of followers, at least contribute to the movement against forgetting, or the straightening of '65 history, the struggle of Kendeng, etc., there are so many things that VV can do without having to spend money," Jerinx said. Vallen apologised in her Instagram, saying that she did not mean to ruin the song by singing it in a dangdut koplo arrangement. Jerinx later accepted the apology, but still stands by the previous comments.

== Discography ==
=== Albums (Indie Label) ===
- Case 15 (1997, Independent Entertainment)
- Superman Is Dead (1998/1999)
- Bad bad bad (2002)

=== Albums (Indie Compilation) ===
- 100% Attitude, 1999, Produksi Lunatic Records, Format Cassette
- No Place To Get Fun, 2002, Format Cassette
- New Generation Calling, 2003, Produksi Spills Record, Format Cassette
- Video Kami "A Rock Society" 2006, Video Clip "Menginjak Neraka", Produksi A Mild Live Production, Trend Setter Magz & The Blado Ent. Format VCD (Not For Sale)

=== Albums (Major Compilation) ===
- Fantastic Bands, April 2005, Produksi Sony Music, Format CD & Cassette
- Class Rock "Today's Sensation", Produksi Sony Music October 2004, Format CD & Cassette
- A Mild Live Soundrenaline 2004, Produksi Sony Music & A Mild Live, November 2004, Format CD & Cassette
- Planet Rock, Produksi Sony Music, August 2005, Format CD & Cassette

=== Albums (Major Label) ===
- Kuta Rock City (May 2003, Sony Music Indonesia)
- The Hangover Decade (Dec 2005, Sony Music Indonesia)
- Black Market Love (April 2006, Sony Music Indonesia)
- Angels And The Outsiders (February 2009, Sony Music Indonesia)
- Sunset di Tanah Anarki (October 2013, Sony Music Indonesia)
- Tiga Perompak Senja (November 2018, Sony Music Indonesia)

== Videography ==
2002

- "White Town" Album "Bad Bad Bad" Director by Outsider Film

2003

- "Kuta Rock City" Album "Kuta Rock City" Director by Rizal Mantovani
- "Punk Hari Ini" Album "Kuta Rock City" Director by Ridwan

2004

- "Muka Tebal" Album "The Hangover Decade" Director by Outsider Film
- "Rock ‘N Roll Band" Album "The Hangover Decade" Director by Outsider Film
- "Disposable Lies" Album "The Hangover Decade" Director by Umum Production

2006

- "Bukan Pahlawan" Album "Black Market Love "Director by Eric Est Movie
- "Black Market Love" Album "Black Market Love" Director by Bob Calabrito

2007

- "Menginjak Neraka" Album "Black Market Love" Director by Eric Est. Movie
- "Lady Rose" Album "Black Market Love "Director by Eric Est. Movie
- "Goodbye Whiskey" Album "Black Market Love" Director by Outsider Film

2008

- Superman Is Dead Rock-A-Bali Australian Tour 2007, Produksi outSIDer Inc, Format DVD, For Promotional Stuff Not for Sale

2009

- "Kuat Kita Bersinar" Album "Angels and The Outsiders" Director by Patrick Effendy
- "Jika Kami Bersama- Featuring Shaggy Dog" Album "Angels and The Outsiders" Director by Patrick Effendy
- "Saint Of My Life" Album " Angels and The Outsiders", A footage music video from SID American Tour 2009
