= 2018 Asian Games closing ceremony =

- Date: 2 September 2018; 8 years ago
- Time: 19:00 – 21:25 WIB (UTC+7)
- Location: Jakarta, Indonesia; 6°13′7″S 106°48′9″E
- Filmed by: NET. IGBS
- Footage: The ceremony on the Games' YouTube channel on YouTube

The 2018 Asian Games closing ceremony was held on Sunday, 2 September 2018 at the Gelora Bung Karno Main Stadium in Jakarta. It began at 19:00 Indonesia Western Time (UTC+7) and ended at 21:25 local time. Like the opening ceremony, host event broadcasting company International Games Broadcast Services (IGBS) broadcast the ceremony live internationally. Vice President of Indonesia Jusuf Kalla, president of International Olympic Committee Thomas Bach, and president of Olympic Council of Asia Sheikh Ahmad Al-Fahad Al-Sabah were among the dignitaries in attendance.

President of Indonesia Joko Widodo, accompanied by then-West Nusa Tenggara Governor Muhammad Zainul Majdi, addressed the ceremony via teleconference from an emergency shelter in Lombok, where a string of earthquakes struck four weeks earlier. Vice President Kalla delivered a bilingual speech, while Sheikh Al-Sabah officially closed the Games. Through the president of the Chinese Olympic Committee Gou Zhongwen, Mayor of Hangzhou Xu Liyi received the Games torch, the first Games flag and the OCA flag from Jakarta Governor Anies Baswedan, South Sumatra Governor Alex Noerdin, and Coordinating Minister for Human Development and Cultural Affairs Puan Maharani, respectively. Hangzhou-born and raised multinational holding conglomerate Alibaba founder Jack Ma and Hangzhou-born and raised gold medal-winning swimmer Sun Yang promoted their birth city Hangzhou, as the city will host the 2022 Asian Games.

== Performing artists ==
The closing ceremony featured tattoo-style performance from Indonesian National Armed Forces and Indonesian National Police Academy Drum Corps. In addition to local artists and a Chinese segment involving traditional dance and music, the South Korean boybands Super Junior and iKon, and Indian singer Sidharth Slathia performed in the ceremony.

Below is the list of artists who performed during the ceremony.

=== Indonesian artists ===
- The Resonanz Children's Choir (performing "Indonesia Raya" (Indonesian National Anthem))
- Isyana Sarasvati (performing "Asia's Who We Are" and "Bright as the Sun")
- Bams and Lea Simanjuntak (performing "Kemesraan," followed by the cauldron's lit-off)
- GIGI (performing "Rumah Kita" and "Terbang")
- Denada (performing "Koi Mil Gaya" and "Kuch Kuch Hota Hai" with Sidharth Slathia)
- Siti Badriah (performing "Jaran Goyang" and "Lagi Syantik")
- Jevin Julian and Winky Wiryawan (performing instrumental music for "Lagi Syantik," sung by Siti Badriah)
- RAN (performing "Pandangan Pertama," "Inikah Cinta," "Malam Ini Indah," and "Bright as the Sun")
- Bunga Citra Lestari (performing "Aku Wanita" and "Dance Tonight")
- JFlow (performing "Dance Tonight" with Bunga Citra Lestari and "Unbeatable" with Dira Sugandi)
- Dira Sugandi (performing "Unbeatable" with JFlow)
- Alffy Rev, Irfan of "Samsons," and Ade of "Govinda" (performing instrumentals for "Bright as the Sun," sung by Isyana Sarasvati and RAN; collaboration with sapeh player; and for "Meraih Bintang," sung by Afgansyah Reza)
- Afgansyah Reza (performing "Meraih Bintang")

=== Foreign artists ===
- (China) Jackson Yee (performing "Dream of Hope")
- (India) Sidharth Slathia (performing "Koi Mil Gaya," "Kuch Kuch Hota Hai," and "Jai Ho")
- (South Korea) iKON (performing "Love Scenario" and "Rhythm Ta")
- (South Korea) Super Junior (performing "Sorry, Sorry," "Mr. Simple," and "Bonamana")

== Notable guests ==
=== Indonesians ===
- Jusuf Kalla, Vice President of Indonesia and Indonesia Asian Games Organizing Committee (INASGOC) steering committee chairman
- Mufidah Mi'ad Saad, Second Lady of Indonesia
- Megawati Sukarnoputri, former president (and previously vice president) of Indonesia
- Sinta Nuriyah, former first lady of Indonesia, and her daughter Yenny Wahid
- Try Sutrisno, former vice president of Indonesia
- Tuti Sutiawati, former second lady of Indonesia
- Imam Nahrawi, Youth and Sports Minister of Indonesia
- Retno Marsudi, Foreign Minister of Indonesia
- Darmin Nasution, Coordinating Minister for Economic Affairs of Indonesia
- Puan Maharani, Coordinating Minister for Human Development and Cultural Affairs of Indonesia and INASGOC steering committee first vice chairwoman
- Luhut Binsar Pandjaitan, Coordinating Minister for Maritime Affairs of Indonesia
- Sri Mulyani Indrawati, Finance Minister of Indonesia
- Syafruddin, Minister of State Apparatus Utilization and Bureaucratic Reform of Indonesia and chef de mission of the Indonesian contingent
- Eko Putro Sandjojo, Minister of Village, Underdeveloped Regions Development, and Transmigration Affairs of Indonesia
- Mohamad Oemar, head of the Vice-Presidential Secretariat of Indonesia
- Rita Subowo, Vice President of the Olympic Council of Asia for the 2018 Asian Games and 2021 Asian Youth Games
- Erick Thohir, INASGOC and Indonesian Olympic Committee chairman
- Anies Baswedan, Governor of Jakarta and INASGOC steering committee member
- Alex Noerdin, Governor of South Sumatra and INASGOC steering committee member

=== Foreign dignitaries ===
- Thomas Bach, president of the International Olympic Committee
- Ahmed Al-Fahad Al-Ahmed Al-Sabah, president of the Olympic Council of Asia
- Gou Zhongwen, president of the Chinese Olympic Committee and director of the State General Administration of Sports of China
- Xu Liyi, Mayor of Hangzhou, China

== See also ==
- 2018 Asian Para Games opening and closing ceremonies
