= JRX =

JRX may refer to:

- Jerinx, an Indonesian musician
- Bell 505 Jet Ranger X, an American/Canadian light helicopter
