= Jerinx =

Indonesian musician and activist (born 1977)

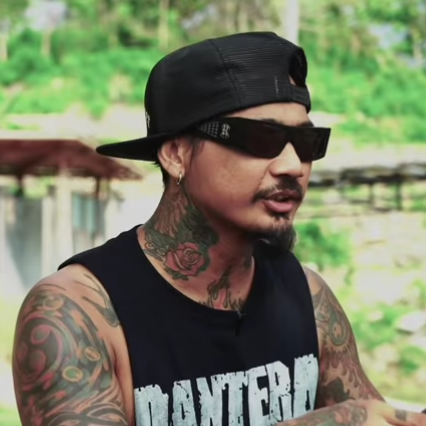
- Jerinx in 2018

Background information
- Also known as: JRX
- Born: I Gede Ari Astina; 10 February 1977 (age 49); Kuta, Bali, Indonesia
- Genres: Punk rock; Pop punk; country rock; alternative rock; garage rock; skate-punk; folk rock; hard rock; heavy metal
- Occupations: Musician; singer; social media activist
- Instruments: Singing; guitar; drums
- Spouse: Nora Alexandra (m. 2019)

I Gede Ari Astina (born 10 February 1977), better known Jerinx or JRX is an Indonesian musician and conspiracy theorist on COVID-19. He is the drummer of the Bali-based rock band Superman Is Dead.

In 2020, Jerinx was sentenced to jail for defamation, after he accused Indonesia's chief medical association of being servile to the World Health Organization for mandating COVID-19 testing for pregnant women, which he claimed could kill them and their babies. He was released in June 2021.

== Early and personal life ==
Jerinx was born on February 10, 1977 in a Balinese Hindu family. His birth name is Gede Ari Astina. In an interview, he revealed that he was named Astina after the kingdom Hastina from the epic Mahabharata.

In 2019, Jerinx married the model and businesswoman Nora Alexandra (b. 1994); their age difference of 18 years drew attention in the media. She is of Swiss descent from her father's side, and her mother is a Javanese. Initially a Muslim, Alexandra revealed that she converted to Hinduism post-marriage, inspired by her husband Jerinx.

== Career ==
Jerinx graduated from high school in 1995 and started his music career the same year with Superman Is Dead (SID), a band with three members: Bobby Kool (lead vocal, guitar), Eka Rock (bass and backing vocal) and Jerinx (drummer).

Albums produced by SID include Case 15 (1997), Kuta Rock City (2003), Black Market Love (2006) and Sunset di Tanah Anarki (2013). The latter most had Jerinx writing 11 songs, including "Jadilah Legenda", which had socialist themes. It was highly popular among the audience. Marcel Thee of Vice described SID as "hands-down Indonesia's biggest pop-punk band" in 2018.

Jerinx has also appeared in a few films and manages several businesses related to lodging, clothing, and bars.

== Activism ==
=== Rejection against land reclamation of Benoa Bay ===
Jerinx has been against land reclamation in Benoa Bay, Bali since 2014 because of its social impacts. On July 10, 2018, Jerinx demanded that Indonesian President Joko Widodo fulfill his promise in 2015 to follow up on the Benoa Bay reclamation issue.

== Controversy ==
Jerinx has drawn public attention for his criticism of several political figures, including the Minister of Maritime Affairs and Fisheries, Susi Pudjiastuti, Anang Hermansyah, and also of President Joko Widodo regarding the Surabaya bombings.

=== Via Vallen's copyright infringement case ===
On November 11, 2018, Jerinx criticized dangdut singer Via Vallen in an Instagram post for recycling the 2013 SID song "Sunset di Tanah Anarki" without permission. Vallen is said to have lost the meaning of the song.

"VV [Via Vallen] should have learned to be human, don't just take it. During this time singing SDTA [Sunset di Tanah Anarchy] thousands of times, did our song lyrics have no meaning for her? After her success, what can you do to appreciate the works that bring you to a better place? With millions of followers, at least contribute to the Melawan Lupa movement, or 1965 historical rectification, Kendeng's struggle, etc., there are so many things that VV can do without having to spend money."

Vallen apologized through his Instagram account, saying that he did not mean to spoil the song by singing it in the dangdut koplo arrangement. Jerinx later accepted the apology, but did not withdraw his previous comment.

=== Rejection of Music Bill ===
In February 2019, Jerinx was involved in a controversy with Anji, another Indonesian musician, regarding the issue of the Music Bill. After Anji's vlog video on YouTube interviewing Anang Hermansyah regarding the Music Bill, Jerinx threatened Anji not to use their feud as a YouTube content to gain popularity and YouTube ad revenue.

=== Imprisonment for Defamation of the Indonesian Doctors Association ===
In 2020, Jerinx began sharing unfounded conspiracy theories about coronavirus via social media and television interviews. He accused the "global elite", including Bill Gates, of being behind the pandemic. He spurned calls for social distancing and mask-wearing. In a post on his Instagram account, he accused the Indonesian Doctors Association (IDI) of being "lackeys" of the World Health Organization for requiring that mothers about to give birth be tested for coronavirus. He also claimed the test could kill people. In August 2020, Bali Police named him a suspect for alleged defamation of IDI. In October, he was arrested and charged with defamation, under articles of the Indonesia's Information and Electronic Transactions Law (UU ITE) and Criminal Code (KUHP).

Jerinx went on trial at Bali's Denpasar District Court. State prosecutor Otong Hendra Rahayu demanded he be sentenced to three years in prison. On 19 November 2020, the court sentenced Jerinx, to 14 months in prison for spreading hate speech against IDI via social media.

He was released early from Kerobokan Prison on 8 June 2021. He was picked up by his wife Nora, declined to comment, and proceeded with a self-cleaning ceremony in Ubud.

== Discography ==
- Case 15 (1997)
- Superman Is Dead (1998/1999)
- Bad Bad Bad (2002)
- Kuta Rock City (2003)
- The Hangover Decade (2005)
- Black Market Love (2006)
- Angels & the Outsiders (2009)
- Sunset di Tanah Anarki (2013)
- Tiga Perompak Senja (2018)

== Filmography ==
Year	Film	Role	Notes
2012	Rumah di Seribu Ombak	Ngurah Panji	
2017	Susah Sinyal	Rocky	
2018	Mama Mama Jagoan	Jack	
2019	Lagi-Lagi Ateng	Gusti	
