= Koplo =

Genre of Indonesian popular music

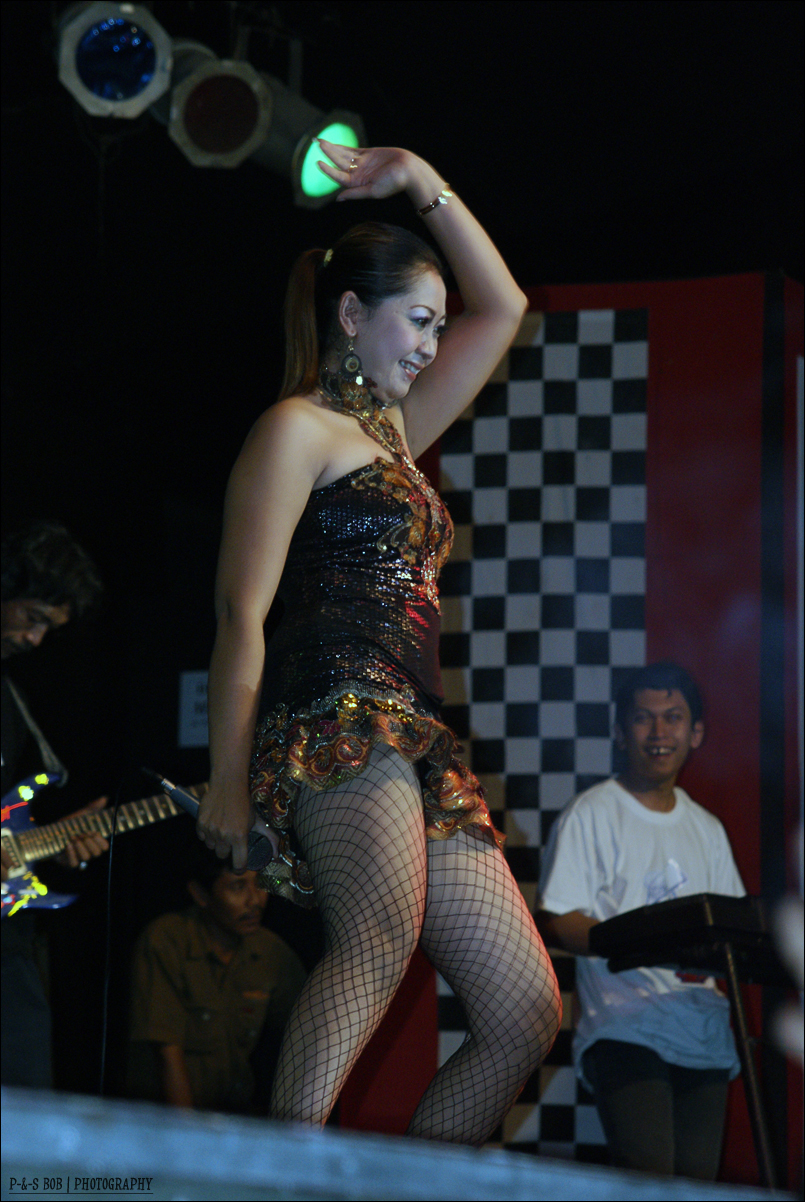
- Koplo singer in Yogyakarta
- Other names: Dangdut koplo
- Stylistic origins: Dangdut; jaipongan; dangdut kotekan; dangdut campursari (congdut)
- Cultural origins: Early 2000s, Jarak, East Java
- Typical instruments: Vocals; gendang; synthesizer; drum set
- Derivative forms: Dangdut pantura; jaranan dangdut (jandhut); pop koplo

Koplo or dangdut koplo is a subgenre of dangdut, Indonesian popular dance & folk music, that originated in East Java during the early 2000s. The genre gets its name from the slang term "koplo", which refers to a hallucinogenic drug that is sold cheaply in Indonesia. Dangdut koplo is played at a faster tempo than the standard dangdut music and said to make listeners "feel high" thus giving the same effect as consuming koplo pills. Koplo also differs musically from the regular dangdut in the dominant role of the drummer, who plays more complex drum patterns.

Traditional koplo in East Java is notable for the live performances, in which female singers dance erotically by shaking their hips and chests in revealing clothes. The audience also gives money directly to the singer on stage. These characteristic performances have given the notion of koplo as "immoral" music in the eyes of traditional dangdut musicians. Rhoma Irama, one of the most influential dangdut singers also known as "the king of dangdut", repeatedly criticized koplo during the early 2000s and attempted to distance it from the general dangdut genre.

Nevertheless, koplo has become one of the most popular musical genres in Indonesia, especially with the advent of pop koplo, which does not employ overtly sexual performances. Some of the pioneering koplo musicians include Inul Daratista, who popularized koplo in the 2000s. The derivative genre of pop koplo was popularized in the mid-2010s by artists such as Via Vallen and Nella Kharisma.

== Characteristics ==
The drum is the most important element of koplo. According to Cak Met, a popular koplo drummer, the regular dangdut is played in 3/4 bar while koplo is played in a faster 4/4 bar, thus requiring a more complex drumming technique. The standard drum pattern of dangdut is called chalte which consists of five types of sound, including three that are played by the large drum that is placed on the left side of the drummer and two that are produced by the small drum on the right. According to Andrew N. Weintraub of the University of Pittsburgh, the koplo drum pattern multiplies all of these sound elements and contains twice the sound of the large drum than the chalte of the standard dangdut.

Weintraub traces the origin of these complex drum patterns to Sundanese drum players in West Java who played the traditional jaipongan music. The jaipongan drum pattern was reinterpreted by dangdut musicians in Surabaya and Banyuwangi, thus the making of koplo drum patterns went through a cross-cultural process between different ethnic groups.

Because of the vital position of the drums in the koplo live performances, drum players often become icons. Among the well-known koplo drummers are Cak Met (also known as Ki Ageng), Waryo from OM Armega, and Cak Juri from OM Montana.

Each region in East Java has its own style of koplo drums. Unique koplo drums can be seen in Sidoarjo, Gresik, Nganjuk, Madiun, Ponorogo, and Sragen. Dangdut, which employs these regional drums, is also called jaranan dangdut or jandhut. While drum patterns and rhythm are no different from the regular koplo, jandhut style uses additional drums called sabet and bem. Well known jandhut drummer includes Mas Malik from OM Lagista, hailed from Nganjuk.

== History ==
Several theories exist on the origin of dangdut koplo. This includes dangdut kotekan which was being played since 1993 in the Girilaya region of Surabaya. Dangdut kotekan was music played to wake up the community for sahur during the Islamic holy month of Ramadan. The drumming technique of dangdut kotekan was developed by drummers Mas Naryo and Mas Sugeng. Other stylistic origin traces to dangdut campursari (congdut) based in the Banyuwangi area, which is known for traditional rhythms and thickness of kempul drums. Koplo also blended in elements from other regional musical genres, including West Javanese pop sunda and East Javanese kendang kempul.

The more direct origin of koplo can be traced back to Jarak on the outskirts of Surabaya. A well-known koplo drummer, Cak Met, confirms this by saying, "Dangdut koplo was born in Jarak, but if you talk about who created it for the first time, it will be confusing. There is a fear of people claiming each other." Dangdut koplo began to enjoy local popularity in the Pantura (an abbreviation of "Pantai Utara" which means "North Coast") area among the working class, such as fishermen, as well as bus and truck drivers who cross the coast. This audience remains among the most loyal fanbase of koplo until today.

Koplo began to enjoy nationwide popularity in 2003 after the debut of Inul Daratista. Hailing from Pasuruan, Inul began her career in the East Java region, and her recordings spread nationwide through pirated VCDs. Inul made headlines with her suggestive goyang ngebor (drilling dance) featured in Goyang Inul (Inul's dance). The popularity of koplo was also fueled by the saturation of the dangdut scene, thus prompted listeners to explore fresh sounds.

The debut and popularity of Inul, however, caused controversy among the traditional dangdut musicians, chiefly Rhoma Irama, who is known as "raja dangdut" (the king of dangdut). Rhoma condemned Inul's style and koplo in general as pornographic, and expressed the need to return dangdut to its khittah (origin), and laid out three points which are: 1) dangdut is not koplo, 2) koplo is like a parasite that created the stigma of dangdut being dirty music, 3) dangdut dance is meant to fulfill choreography. Rhoma also designed a T-shirt that states "koplo is not dangdut." The feud culminated in Inul, as a newcomer in the dangdut scene, finally visiting Rhoma's house and receiving a lecture on morality, and she cried.

However, the popularity of koplo did not diminish. It evolved into a more easily accessible derivative form known as pop koplo by incorporating musical styles of pop music and fashion styles heavily influenced by K-Pop and began to display chic and elegant impressions. The new wave of koplo artists also enjoyed the popularity of YouTube and other social media. Artists who embody pop koplo include Via Vallen (Ascada Music Indonesia), Nella Kharisma (Samudra Record), Siti Badriah (Nagaswara Record), and Ayu Ting Ting (Hits Records). Via Vallen's hit song "Sayang" characteristically employs elements of reggaeton and rap, and gendang koplo beat is played only during the chorus and bridge, conforming to the generic pop sensibility of young generations.

Koplo and its artists are considered enjoying the golden age in the late 2010s. As of March 2021, the music video for Siti Badriah's song "Lagi Syantik" has been recorded over 635 million views on YouTube. Via Vallen recorded "Meraih Bintang", a pop song with dangdut elements, for the official theme song of the 2018 Asian Games. In 2020, Via Vallen collaborated with Rhoma Irama on a song "Cuma Kamu." Rhoma commended Via for her music and invited her for the duet.
