= 17th Asian Games Incheon 2014 Official Album =

Compilation album
- Released: 20 June 2014
- Label: Universal Music

Asian Games chronology
| 17th Asian Games Incheon 2014 Official Album (2014) | Energy of Asia: Official Album of Asian Games 2018 (2018) |

The 17th Asian Games Incheon 2014 Official Album is a compilation album that was released on 20 June 2014. It features songs written and selected for the 2014 Asian Games in Incheon.

== Track listing ==
=== CD1 ===
1. "We Are the Champions" (2011 Remaster) – Queen
2. "Moves like Jagger" – Maroon 5 featuring Christina Aguilera
3. "Applause" – Lady Gaga
4. "Roar" – Katy Perry
5. "We Are Golden" – Mika
6. "I Could Be the One" – Avicii vs. Nicky Romero
7. "Spectrum" – Zedd featuring Matthew Koma
8. "Burn" – Ellie Goulding
9. "Safe and Sound" – Capital Cities
10. "The Phoenix" – Fall Out Boy
11. "I Gotta Feeling" – The Black Eyed Peas
12. "Shine" – Take That
13. "Tubthumping" – Chumbawamba
14. "The Winner Takes It All" – ABBA
15. "Chariots of Fire" – Vangelis

=== CD2 ===
1. "Hymm" – OCA
2. "Only One" (The Incheon Asiad song) – JYJ (South Korea)
3. "The Holy Sound of Love" – Sa Dingding (China)
4. "Hen Hen 狠狠" – Kary Ng (Hong Kong)
5. "Celebrate" – Apache Indian featuring Raghav (India)
6. "Victory" – Andra and The BackBone (Indonesia)
7. "Spending All My Time" – Perfume (Japan)
8. "Gemilang" – Ella (Malaysia)
9. "Paradise" – Sabrina (Philippines)
10. "Yi Qi Wo Wo 一起喔喔" – Sodagreen (Taiwan)
11. "Ter Mai Dai Yu Kon Deaw Bon Lok Nee" – King Pichet (Thailand)

== Charts ==
| Chart (2014) | Peak position |
|---|---|
| South Korean Albums (Circle) | 27 |
