= IKon videography =

iKON video discography
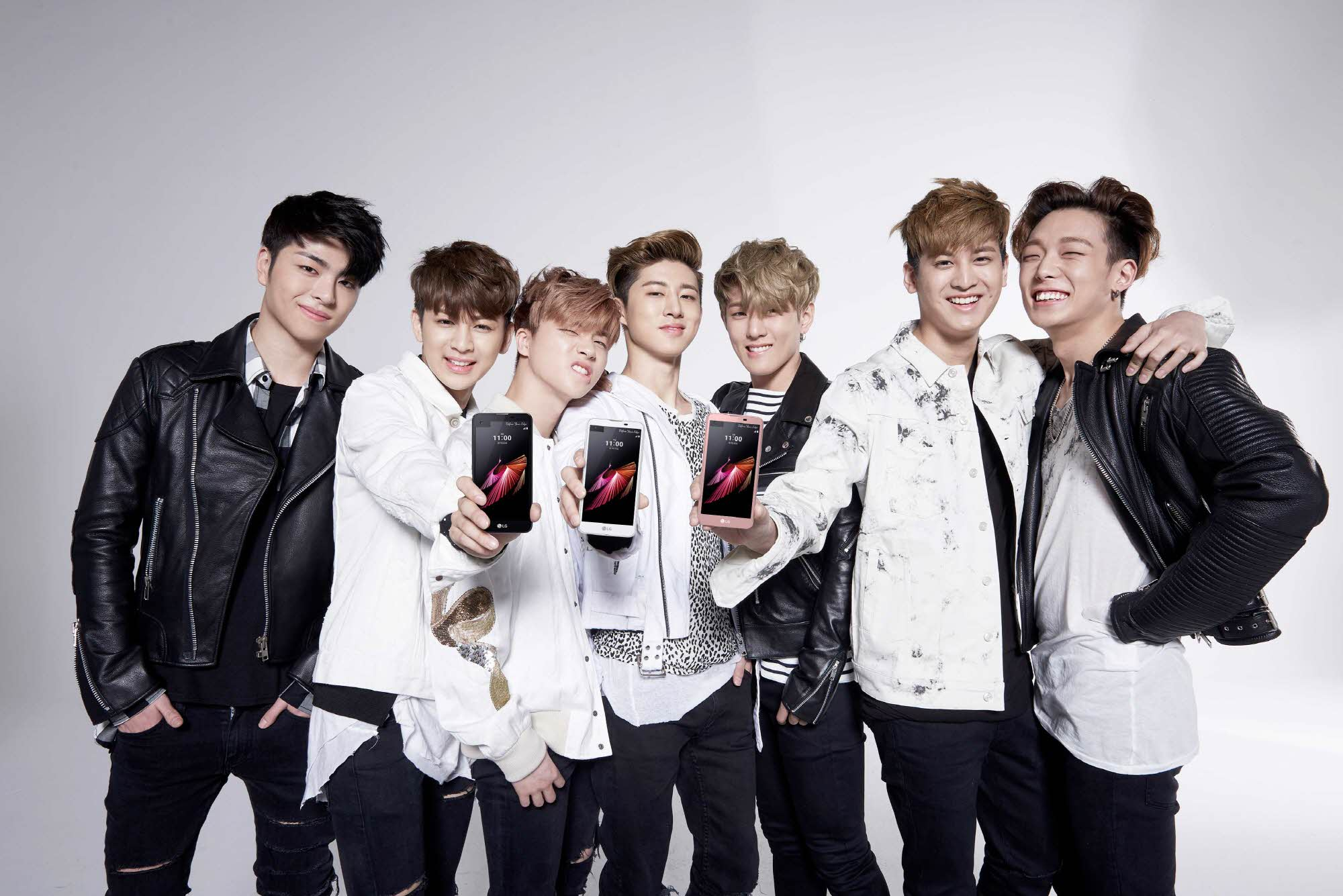
- iKON for LG
- Music videos: 19
- Concert tour videos: 6
- Video compilations: 3

The videography of South Korean group iKon consists of 19 music videos, 6 concert tour videos and 3 music video compilation. The group sold over 40,000 physical DVD/Blu-ray in Japan as a group.

== Video albums ==
=== Concert tour videos ===
Title	Album details	Peak chart positions		Sales
Title	Album details	JPN		Sales
Title	Album details	DVD	Blu-ray	Sales
2015-2016 iKoncert 'Showtime' in Seoul Live DVD	Released: June 21, 2016; Labels: YG Entertainment; Format: DVD	—	—	
iKoncert 2016 Showtime Tour in Japan	Released: June 22, 2016 (JPN); Labels: YG Entertainment, YGEX; Format: DVD, Blu-ray	3	3	JPN: 12,779
iKON Japan Tour 2016	Released: February 2, 2017 (JPN); Labels: YG Entertainment, YGEX; Format: DVD, Blu-ray	1	1	JPN: 18,048
iKON Japan Dome Tour 2017	Released: February 2, 2017 (JPN); Labels: YG Entertainment, YGEX; Format: DVD, Blu-ray	4	24	JPN: 12,840
iKON Japan Dome Tour 2017 Additional Dates	Released: March 7, 2018 (JPN); Labels: YG Entertainment, YGEX; Format: DVD, Blu-ray	5	8	JPN: 5,245
iKON Japan Tour 2019	Released: December 4, 2019 (JPN); Labels: YG Entertainment, YGEX; Format: DVD, Blu-ray	—	—	—N/a
"—" denotes releases that did not chart or were not released in that region.

=== Other releases ===
Title	Album details	Peak chart positions		Sales
Title	Album details	JPN		Sales
Title	Album details	DVD	Blu-ray	Sales
2016 iKon Season's Greetings	Released: December 23, 2016 (JPN); Labels: YG Entertainment, YGEX; Format: DVD	25	—	JPN: 2,416
Kony's Summertime	Released: August 3, 2016 (JPN); Labels: YG Entertainment, YGEX; Format: DVD	2	—	JPN: 4,655
Kony's Wintertime	Released: February 22, 2017 (JPN); Labels: YG Entertainment, YGEX; Format: DVD	2	—	JPN: 5,415
"—" denotes releases that did not chart or were not released in that region.

== Music videos ==
Title	Year	Director(s)
"My Type" (취향저격)	2015	Sa Min Han
"Rhythm Ta" (리듬 타)	2015	Seo Hyun-seung
"Airplane"	2015	Donald Yong
"Anthem" (이리오너라)	2015	Seo Hyun-seung
"Apology" (지못미)	2015	Sa Min Han
"What's Wrong?" (왜 또)	2015	Sa Min Han
"Dumb & Dumber" (덤앤더머)	2015	Seo Hyun-seung
"#WYD" (오늘 모해)	2016	Sa Min Han
"B-Day" (벌떼)	2017	Kim Young-jo & Yoo Soong-woo (NAIVE)
"Bling Bling"	2017	Seo Hyun-seung
"Love Scenario" (사랑을 했다)	2018	VM Project Architecture
"Killing Me" (죽겠다)	2018	VM Project Architecture
"Goodbye Road" (이별길)	2018	Sa Min Han
"I'm OK"	2019	VM Project Architecture
"Dive" (뛰어들게)	2020	Kwon Yong-soo
"Why Why Why" (왜왜왜)	2021	725 (SL8 Visual Lab)
"But You" (너라는 이유)	2022	Yeom Woojin
"Tantara (Performance MV)"	2023	SNP Film
"U"	2023	SNP Film
"Panorama" Drama Version	2023	SNP Film

== See also ==
- iKon discography
