= 2018 Asian Games =

Multi-sport event in Jakarta and Palembang, Indonesia

XVIII Asian Games
- Host city: Jakarta and Palembang, Indonesia
- Motto: Energy of Asia (Note: Only the English version of the motto was used during the Games. There was no Indonesian equivalent of the motto adopted.)
- Nations: 45
- Athletes: 11,300
- Events: 465 in 46 sports (61 disciplines)
- Opening: 18 August 2018
- Closing: 2 September 2018
- Opened by: Joko Widodo; President of Indonesia
- Closed by: Ahmad Al-Fahad Al-Sabah; President of the Olympic Council of Asia
- Athlete's Oath: Arki Dikania Wisnu
- Judge's Oath: Wahyana
- Torch lighter: Susi Susanti
- Main venue: Gelora Bung Karno Main Stadium
- Website: asiangames2018.id (archived)

Summer

Winter

The 2018 Asian Games (Indonesian: Pesta Olahraga Asia 2018 or Asian Games 2018), officially known as the XVIII Asian Games, and also known as Jakarta-Palembang 2018 or Indonesia 2018, were a continental multi-sport event that was held from 18 August to 2 September 2018 in Jakarta and Palembang.

For the first time, the Summer Asian Games were co-hosted by two regions; the Indonesian capital of Jakarta (which was hosting the Games for the first time since 1962), and Palembang, the capital of South Sumatra province. Events were held in and around the two cities, including venues in Bandung and the provinces of West Java and Banten. The opening and closing ceremonies of the Games were held at Gelora Bung Karno Stadium in Jakarta. The Games were originally awarded to Hanoi, Vietnam, but withdrew in 2014 due to budgetary concerns and other factors.

Several non-Olympic events were trimmed from the event programme, but several new disciplines being introduced at the 2020 Summer Olympics in Tokyo (including 3-on-3 basketball) were added. Esports and canoe polo were also contested as demonstration sports.

China led the medal tally for the tenth consecutive time. North and South Korea fielded a unified team during the opening ceremony and selected events, and also won their first-ever gold medal as a unified team at a multi-sport event. 6 world, 18 Asian and 86 Asian Games records were broken during the Games, while Japanese swimmer Rikako Ikee was announced as the most valuable player.

== Bidding process ==
The OCA originally planned to hold these Games in 2019 rather than 2018, so that Asian Games would be held exactly a year before the 2020 Summer Olympics instead of the same year as the 2018 Winter Olympics. After they were awarded to Indonesia, the OCA backtracked on these plans and kept the Games in 2018, so that they would not interfere with the 2019 Indonesian general election.

=== Initial bidding ===
Hanoi, Vietnam was originally selected to be the host after they won the bid against two other candidates, Surabaya and Dubai. They were awarded the winning bid on 8 November 2012, with 29 votes against Surabaya's 14 votes. Dubai pulled out at the last minute, instead announcing their intention to focus on future bids. The UAE's National Olympic Committee's vice-president denied any pullout and claimed that Dubai "did not apply for hosting 2019 Asian Games" and had "only considered" doing so.

However, in March 2014, there were some concerns about Vietnam's ability to host. These included concerns over whether the anticipated budget of US$150 million was realistic. There were claims that the government would eventually spend over US$300 million. In addition, critics were concerned that several stadiums built in conjunction with the 2003 Southeast Asian Games had not been utilized since. Former chairman of the Vietnam Olympic Committee Ha Quang Du also claimed that hosting the Asian Games would not boost tourism in Vietnam.

On 17 April 2014, Vietnamese Prime Minister Nguyễn Tấn Dũng officially announced Hanoi's withdrawal from hosting, citing unpreparedness and economic recession as the main reasons for the withdrawal, saying "they have left the country unable to afford the construction of facilities and venues". Many Vietnamese people supported the decision to withdraw. No penalty was imposed for the withdrawal.

=== Appointment of Jakarta and Palembang ===
After Hanoi's withdrawal, the OCA said that Indonesia, China, and the United Arab Emirates were major candidates under consideration to host. Indonesia was widely regarded as a favourite, since Surabaya was the runner-up of the previous bid, and willing to do so if selected. The Philippines and India expressed their interest about hosting the Games, but India failed to submit a late bid because it was unable to get an audience with Prime Minister Narendra Modi after being given an extended deadline by the OCA.

On 5 May 2014, the OCA visited several Indonesian cities, including Jakarta, Surabaya, Bandung, and Palembang. At this time Surabaya decided to drop their bid to host the Games and instead focus on hosting the already scheduled 2021 Asian Youth Games. On 25 July 2014, during a meeting in Kuwait City, the OCA appointed Jakarta as the host of the Games with Palembang as the supporting host. As the capital and the third biggest city on southern hemisphere, Jakarta was chosen because of its well-equipped sports facilities, adequate transportation networks, and other facilities such as hotels and lodging for guests. On 20 September 2014, Indonesia signed the host city contract, and was ceremonially appointed host during the closing ceremony of the 2014 Asian Games in Incheon. An organising committee was formed soon after the appointment.

== Development and preparations ==
=== Costs ===
By 2015, the central government had allocated a budget of IDR 3 trillion (US$224 million) to prepare for the Games, with regional administrations also expected to supply some part of the funding. By July 2018, the budget allocation for the Games had been reported to be IDR 6.6 trillion (US$450 million) including IDR 869 billion (US$59 million) from sponsorships. However, on 2 September 2018, the Finance Minister of Indonesia Sri Mulyani disclosed that IDR 8.2 trillion was financed by 2015–2018 state budget, which was used by the local organizing committee, namely the Indonesia Asian Games Organizing Committee (INASGOC) led by Erick Thohir, for all preparations, opening, organising, and finalizing the implementation of the 2018 Asian Games. The total cost of arranging the Games is estimated about US$3.2 billion, of which $2.4 billion being spent on infrastructure development associated with the games.

=== Volunteers ===
Phase 2 volunteering programme of Jakarta-Palembang 2018 Asian Games began on 18 December 2017 with target of 13,000 volunteers being set. The volunteers wore clothing which included jacket, polo shirts and trousers which they collected from the Uniform Distribution and Accreditation Centre at the Sports and Recreation Arena in East Jakarta. Volunteers also wore accreditation card which gain them access to specific venues and buildings around the site.

=== Torch relay ===
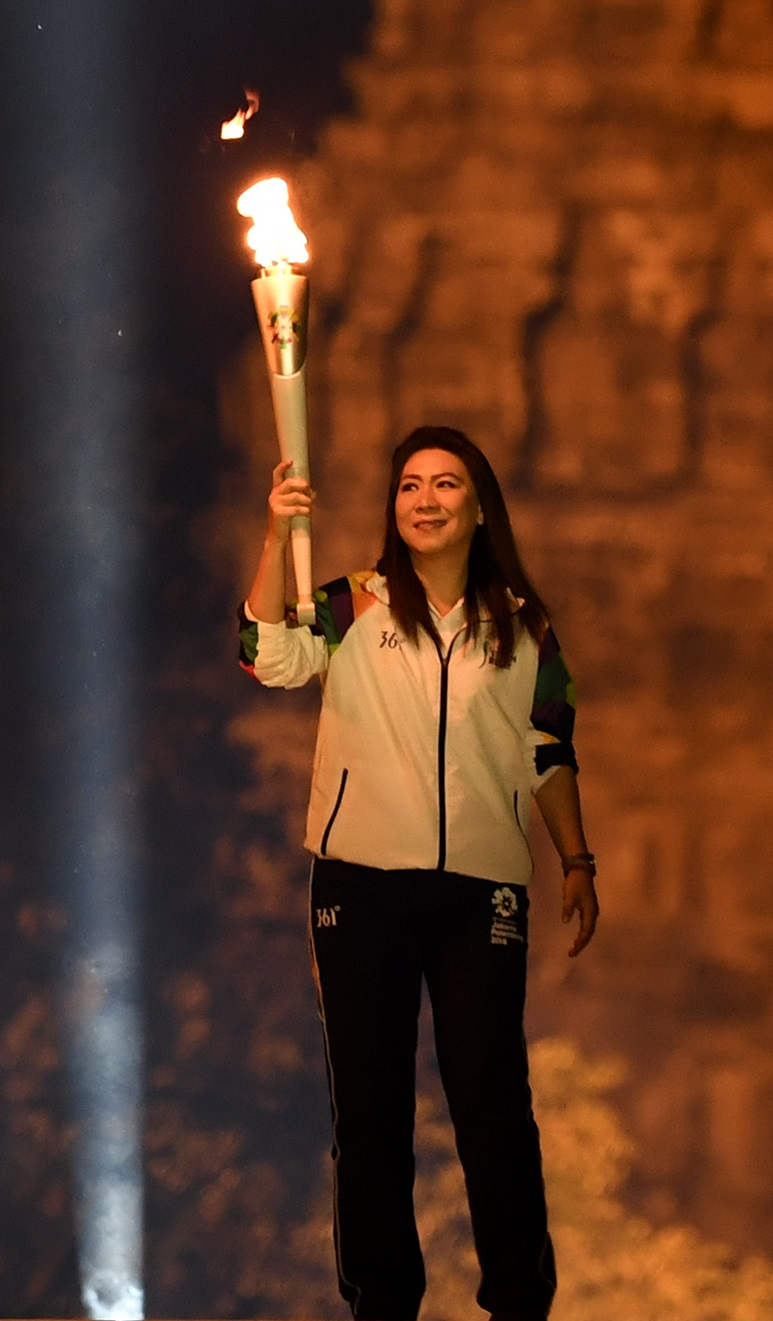
Indonesian badminton legend Susi Susanti carried a torch fire during the Asian Games Torch Relay Concert in the Special Region of Yogyakarta, Indonesia

On 10 May 2018, 100 days before their opening, the Asian Games torch was unveiled. The design was inspired by the golok and skin — traditional weapons originating from Jakarta and Palembang.

The torch relay began at the Major Dhyan Chand National Stadium in New Delhi, host of the 1st Asian Games, on 15 July 2018. The flame was generated from a parabolic mirror directed at the sun. On 18 July 2018, a ceremony took place in Brahma field by the 9th century Hindu temple of Prambanan near Yogyakarta, where the torch's flame from India were fused together with an Indonesian natural eternal flame taken from Mrapen, Central Java. Subsequently, the Torch Relay Concert were performed marking the start of torch relay throughout the country.

The relay travelled through 54 cities in 18 provinces in Indonesia, including host cities. The relay covered a total distance of 18,000 kilometres (11,000 mi). The relay finished on 17 August, the 73rd anniversary of the Proclamation of Indonesian Independence, at the National Monument in Jakarta before being carried into the opening ceremony at Gelora Bung Karno Stadium the next day.

=== Marketing ===
==== Emblem and mascot ====
Bhin Bhin, Kaka, and Atung, the mascots of the 2018 Asian Games

The initial emblem for the 2018 Asian Games was first unveiled on 9 September 2015, in celebration of the country's National Sports Day. On 27 December 2015, the Games' mascot, Drawa, was unveiled by vice president Jusuf Kalla. Both the emblem and mascot were a stylized rendition of the cenderawasih, a rare species of bird in Indonesia.

The designs were widely criticised for their outdated appearance, and Drawa in particular was criticised for having little connection to Indonesian culture and history (with some Indonesians joking that the mascot looked more like a chicken than a cenderawasih). On 7 January 2016, Kalla announced that the original emblem and mascot had been withdrawn based on feedback, and that an open call for new designs would be held in partnership with the Creative Economy Agency.

Out of 60 submissions, the new emblem — entitled "Energy of Asia" — was unveiled on 28 July 2016. The new emblem was modelled upon the Gelora Bung Karno Stadium, and was intended to symbolise unity among Asian countries. Three new mascots were also unveiled: Bhin Bhin, a greater bird-of-paradise; Atung, a Bawean deer; and Kaka, (Note: The mascot was named Ika at the time of announcement, but it was later renamed Kaka.) a Javan rhinoceros. They represent the Eastern, Central, and Western regions of Indonesia, as well as strategy, speed and strength. The mascots' outfits reflect traditional textiles; Bhin Bhin wears a vest with Asmat pattern details, Atung wears a sarong with batik tumpal patterns, and Kaka wears a Palembang songket with floral patterns. Their names were derived from the national motto of Indonesia, Bhinneka Tunggal Ika (Unity in Diversity).

==== Medals ====
The medal designs were unveiled in July 2018, featuring batik designs reflecting the unity and diversity of Indonesian and Asian culture.

==== Promotion ====
On 18 August 2017, simultaneous events were held at Jakarta's National Monument and Palembang's Kuto Besak Fort to mark the one-year milestone before the Games. The event in Jakarta was attended by president Joko Widodo, and featured performances by Taeyeon and Hyoyeon of K-pop group Girls' Generation. Countdown clocks were unveiled at the Selamat Datang Monument and in front of Gelora Sriwijaya Stadium.

Several fun run events were held in Asian countries to promote the Games, beginning with Lahore, Pakistan in December 2017.

==== Merchandising ====
The games' merchandises and licensing products, which included mascot stuffed toys and other items, were sold in stores across Jakarta (including the Super Store at the Gelora Bung Karno Sports Complex) from the end of 2017 to the end of September 2018.

==== Music ====
The official theme song of the Games, "Meraih Bintang" ("Reach for the Stars"), was performed by Via Vallen. The song was included in a larger official album for the Games, released on 13 July 2018 and featuring various Indonesian musicians.

As part of an effort to appeal younger spectators, the Indonesian-Japanese idol group JKT48 was signed to perform at some of the Games' venues, such as jet ski, softball, and volleyball. They performed in select events between 19 August and 1 September in a group consisted of eight members from each of its teams.

==== Philatelic ====
As part of creating a memorable and collectible item, the Indonesian postal service Pos Indonesia issued a philatelic collectible items of the 2018 Asian Games series. These items were issued on 18 January 2018 and 18 August 2018.

== Venues ==
The Games used a mix of new and existing venues in Jakarta and South Sumatra (with organizers aiming to reuse existing facilities and infrastructure, such as those built for the 2011 Southeast Asian Games, to help control costs), as well as Jakarta's neighbouring provinces of Banten, and West Java. Venues were divided into four clusters, with three in Jakarta and its surrounding areas and one in Palembang.

=== Jakarta ===
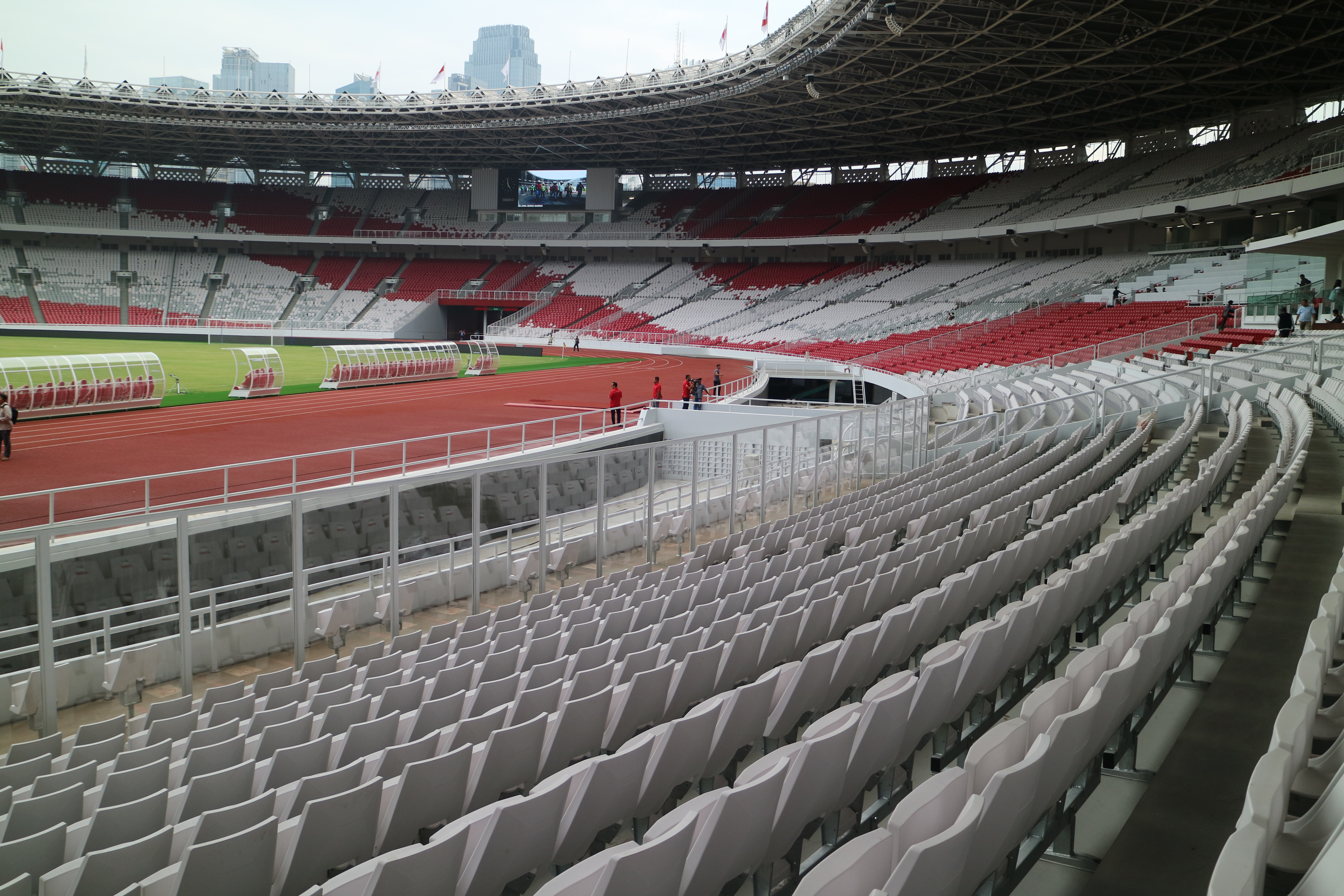
Gelora Bung Karno Main Stadium hosted the ceremonies and athletics events.

The Gelora Bung Karno Sports Complex in Jakarta hosted 13 events. The 56-year-old Main Stadium was refurbished for the Games, replacing its existing bleachers and seating with an all-seater design (reducing its capacity to 77,193), and adding new sound systems and LED lighting among other enhancements.

The Jakarta International Velodrome at Rawamangun in East Jakarta was rebuilt, at a cost of US$40 million for cycling, badminton, futsal, basketball, and wrestling. The Jakarta International Equestrian Park at Pulomas underwent a US$30.8 million renovation, with a capacity of 1,000, 100 stables, lodging for athletes, and other amenities.

=== Palembang ===
Jakabaring Sport City was used as an event site. While there were preliminary plans to increase the size of Gelora Sriwijaya Stadium from 36,000 to 60,000 seats, they were shelved. The site still underwent some renovations, including also being converted from bleachers to an all-seater. A new 40-lane bowling alley was constructed on the complex, as well as eight additional tennis courts. The length of the canoeing and rowing venue in Jakabaring Lake was extended to 2,300 meters, while new rowing facilities and a tribune were built on the lake shore. Other existing venues which was used for Games were also renovated, including Ranau Sports Hall as sepak takraw venue.

=== Athletes' villages ===
A 10-hectare athletes' village was constructed in Jakarta's Kemayoran district, with 7,424 apartments in 10 towers, and a total capacity of 22,272. A second athletes' village was built at Jakabaring Sports City at Palembang, which housed 3,000 athletes and officials.

=== Transport ===
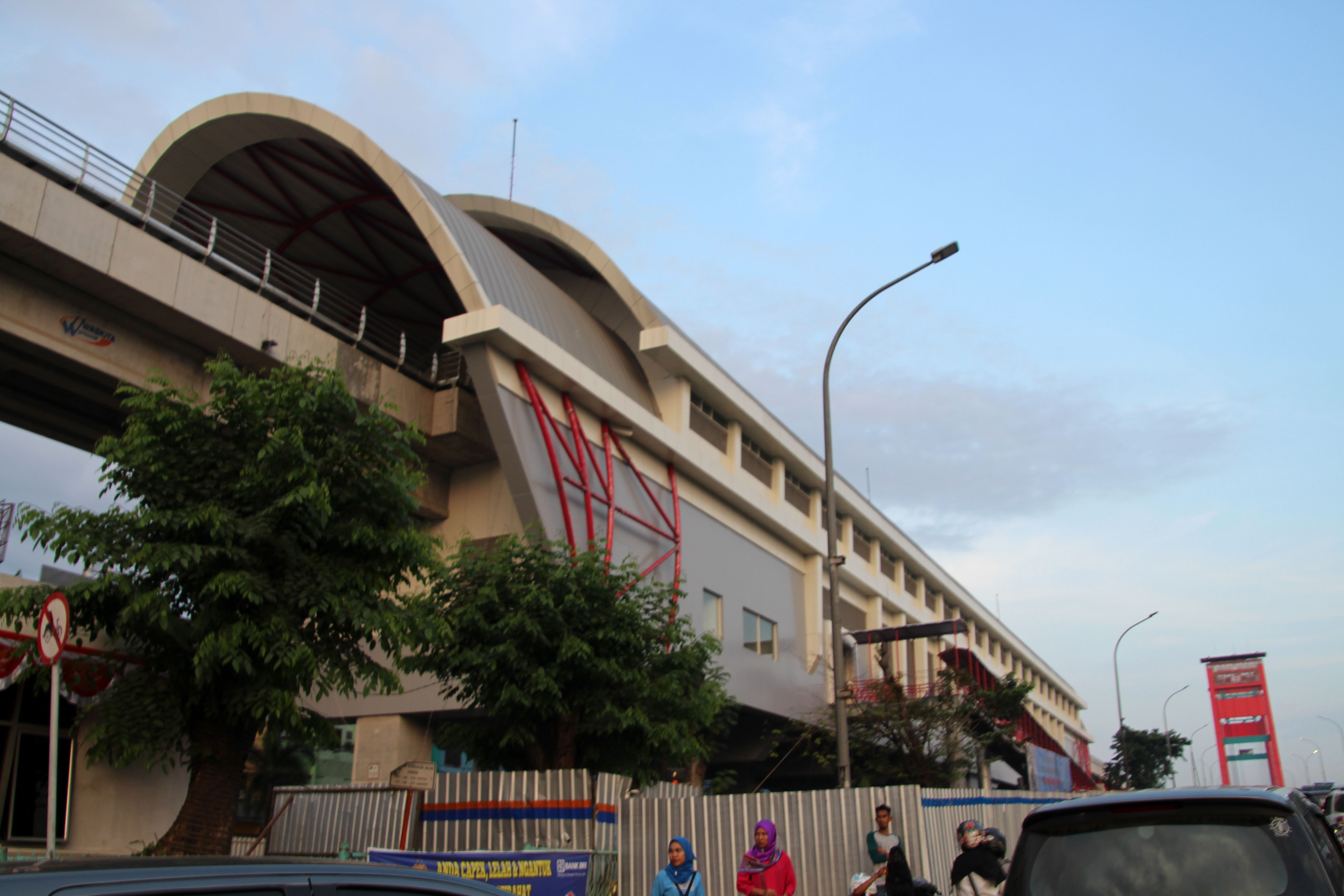
Ampera LRT Station, one of 13 stations of Palembang LRT

As part of the Games preparation, the construction of the Jakarta MRT and Jakarta LRT was accelerated, though neither were ready for general commercial operation at the time of the opening ceremonies. A line of Jakarta LRT connected the Velodrome at Rawamangun in East Jakarta to the Kelapa Gading district of North Jakarta, connecting the Velodrome with the Equestrian Park slightly to the north. City bus operator Transjakarta added 416 buses to serve the officials, and also provide free rides on selected days during the Games.

Palembang upgraded their transportation facilities ahead for the Games by building 25 kilometres of the Palembang Light Rail Transit from Sultan Mahmud Badaruddin II International Airport to Jakabaring Sports City which opened for public use in July 2018. Initially this LRT line was created and open specifically for the Asian Games 2018. Sultan Mahmud Badaruddin II International Airport is expanding its existing arrival and departure terminals to increase its capacity and also connecting the airport with the light rail transit (LRT) terminal by building a skybridge. Other transportation facilities such as toll roads, flyovers, and bridges will be also built in and around the city.

== The Games ==
=== Opening ceremony ===
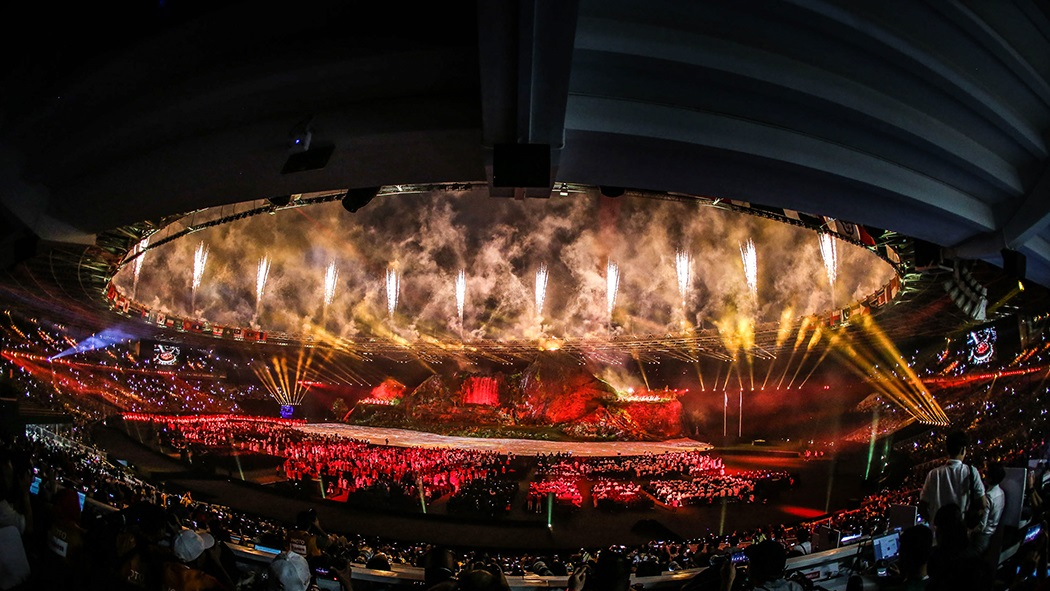
Opening ceremony

The opening ceremony started at 19:00 Western Indonesian Time (UTC+7) on Saturday, 18 August 2018. Wishnutama, then-CEO of Indonesian TV network NET. was the creative director for the ceremony. The ceremony stage showcased a towering 26 meter-high mountain with a waterfall as its background, accompanied by Indonesian plants and flowers. North and South Korea delegates marched together under one unified flag of Korea, which marked the first time both countries did so in the Asian Games after 12 years.

The games was officially opened by the President of Indonesia, Joko Widodo.

=== Sports ===
In March 2017, the Olympic Council of Asia initially announced that the Games would feature 484 events in 42 sports, including the 28 permanent Olympic sports contested at the 2016 Summer Olympics, the five additional sports that will be contested at the 2020 Summer Olympics in Tokyo, as well as events in other non-Olympic sports. In April 2017, the OCA approved reductions in the programme in response to cost concerns; belt wrestling, cricket, kurash, skateboarding, sambo, and surfing were dropped from the programme, and there was to be a reduced number of competitions in bridge, jet ski, jujitsu, paragliding, sport climbing, taekwondo (in particular, all non-Olympic weight classes), and wushu. These changes reduced the total number of events to 431.

The final programme was unveiled in September 2017, increasing it to 462 events in 40 sports (61 disciplines) as the second-largest programme in Asian Games history. Additional disciplines being introduced at the 2020 Summer Olympics were also added, including 3x3 basketball and BMX freestyle.

For the first time in Asian Games history, esports and canoe polo were contested as demonstration sports in the Games. Six video game titles, most notably Pro Evolution Soccer 2018, were featured in the esports events.

2018 Asian Games Sports Programme
- Aquatics
  - Diving
  - Swimming
  - Artistic swimming
  - Water polo
- Archery
- Athletics
- Badminton
- Baseball
  - Baseball
  - Softball
- Basketball
  - 3×3 basketball
  - 5×5 basketball
- Bowling
- Boxing
- Bridge
- Canoeing
  - Dragon boat
  - Slalom
  - Sprint
- Cycling
  - BMX
  - Mountain bike
  - Road
  - Track
- Equestrian
  - Dressage
  - Eventing
  - Jumping
- Fencing
- Field hockey
- Football
- Golf
- Gymnastics
  - Artistic
  - Rhythmic
  - Trampoline
- Handball
- Jet ski
- Judo
- Kabaddi
- Karate
- Martial arts
  - Ju-jitsu
  - Kurash
  - Pencak silat
  - Sambo
  - Wushu
- Modern pentathlon
- Paragliding
- Roller sports
  - Inline speed skating
  - Skateboarding
- Rowing
- Rugby sevens
- Sailing
- Sepak takraw
- Shooting
- Sport climbing
- Squash
- Table tennis
- Taekwondo
- Tennis
  - Tennis
  - Soft tennis
- Triathlon
- Volleyball
  - Volleyball
  - Beach volleyball
- Weightlifting
- Wrestling

Demonstration sports

- Esports
- Canoe polo

=== Participating National Olympic Committees ===
All 45 members of the Olympic Council of Asia participated in the games. North Korea and South Korea competed as a unified team in some events under the name "Korea" (COR), and marched together under the Korean Unification Flag during the opening and closing ceremonies. With a gold medal in the Women's 500 metre dragon boat competition, a unified team won their first-ever gold medal in a multi-sport event.

Originally set to compete as Independent Asian Athletes, the Kuwaitis were allowed to compete under their own flags just two days before the opening ceremony.

Below is a list of all the participating NOCs. The number of competitors per delegation is indicated in brackets.

Participating National Olympic Committees
- Afghanistan (65)
- Bahrain (109)
- Bangladesh (117)
- Bhutan (24)
- Brunei (15)
- Cambodia (43)
- China (845)
- Hong Kong (580)
- India (572)
- Indonesia (938) (host)
- Iran (378)
- Iraq (56)
- Japan (762)
- Jordan (35)
- Kazakhstan (440)
- Korea (60)
- North Korea (168)
- South Korea (807)
- Kuwait (24)
- Kyrgyzstan (211)
- Laos (142)
- Lebanon (28)
- Macau (109)
- Malaysia (426)
- Maldives (146)
- Mongolia (269)
- Myanmar (112)
- Nepal (185)
- Oman (47)
- Pakistan (245)
- Palestine (88)
- Philippines (272)
- Qatar (222)
- Saudi Arabia (169)
- Singapore (265)
- Sri Lanka (173)
- Syria (73)
- Chinese Taipei (588)
- Tajikistan (112)
- Thailand (829)
- Timor-Leste (69)
- Turkmenistan (72)
- United Arab Emirates (138)
- Uzbekistan (232)
- Vietnam (352)
- Yemen (32)

Number of athletes by National Olympic Committees (by highest to lowest)

IOC	Country	Athletes
INA	Indonesia	938
CHN	China	845
THA	Thailand	829
KOR	South Korea	807
JPN	Japan	762
TPE	Chinese Taipei	588
HKG	Hong Kong	580
IND	India	572
KAZ	Kazakhstan	440
MAS	Malaysia	426
IRI	Iran	378
VIE	Vietnam	352
PHI	Philippines	272
MGL	Mongolia	269
SGP	Singapore	265
PAK	Pakistan	245
UZB	Uzbekistan	232
QAT	Qatar	222
KGZ	Kyrgyzstan	211
NEP	Nepal	185
SRI	Sri Lanka	173
KSA	Saudi Arabia	169
PRK	North Korea	168
MDV	Maldives	146
LAO	Laos	142
UAE	United Arab Emirates	138
BAN	Bangladesh	117
MYA	Myanmar	112
TJK	Tajikistan	112
BRN	Bahrain	109
MAC	Macau	109
PLE	Palestine	88
SYR	Syria	73
TKM	Turkmenistan	72
TLS	Timor-Leste	69
AFG	Afghanistan	65
COR	Korea	60
IRQ	Iraq	56
OMA	Oman	47
CAM	Cambodia	43
JOR	Jordan	35
YEM	Yemen	32
LBN	Lebanon	28
BHU	Bhutan	24
KUW	Kuwait	24
BRU	Brunei	15

=== Calendar ===
All times are in Western Indonesia Time (UTC+7)

OC	Opening ceremony	●	Event competitions	1	Gold medal events	CC	Closing ceremony

August/September		10th Fri	11th Sat	12th Sun	13th Mon	14th Tue	15th Wed	16th Thu	17th Fri	18th Sat	19th Sun	20th Mon	21st Tue	22nd Wed	23rd Thu	24th Fri	25th Sat	26th Sun	27th Mon	28th Tue	29th Wed	30th Thu	31st Fri	1st Sat	2nd Sun	Events
Ceremonies										OC															CC	—N/a
Aquatics	Artistic swimming																		●	1	1					55
Aquatics	Diving																			2	2	2	2	2		55
Aquatics	Swimming										7	7	7	8	6	6										55
Aquatics	Water polo							●	●		●	●	1				●	●	●	●	●	●	●	1		55
Archery													●	●	●	●	●	●	4	4						8
Athletics																	4	11	7	7	9	10				48
Badminton											●	●	●	2	●	●	●	●	2	3						7
Baseball	Baseball																	●	●	●		●	●	1		2
Baseball	Softball										●	●	●		●	1										2
Basketball	5 x 5					●	●	●	●		●	●	●		●	●	●	●	●	●		●	●	2		2
Basketball	3 x 3												●	●	●	●	●	2								2
Bowling														1	1	1	1	●	2							6
Boxing																●	●	●	●	●	●		●	10		10
Bridge													●	●	●	●	●	●	3	●	●	●	●	3		6
Canoeing	Slalom												●	2	2											16
Canoeing	Sprint																				●	6	●	6		16
Cycling	BMX																2									24
Cycling	Mountain biking											2	2													24
Cycling	Road cycling													1	1	2										24
Cycling	Track cycling																		2	3	2	3	4			24
Dragon boat																	2	2	1							5
Equestrian												1	●		1	●	●	2	●	1		1				6
Fencing											2	2	2	2	2	2										12
Field hockey											●	●	●	●	●	●	●	●	●	●	●	●	1	1		2
Football		●		●		●	●	●	●		●	●	●	●	●	●	●	●	●	●	●		1	1		2
Golf															●	●	●	4								4
Gymnastics	Artistic											1	1	2	5	5										18
Gymnastics	Rhythmic																		1	1						18
Gymnastics	Trampolining																					2				18
Handball					●	●	●	●	●		●	●	●	●		●	●		●	●	●	1	1			2
Jet ski															●	1	2	1								4
Judo																					4	5	5	1		15
Jujitsu																3	3	2								8
Kabaddi											●	●	●	●	●	2										2
Karate																	4	4	4							12
Kurash																				3	2	2				7
Modern pentathlon																							1	1		2
Paragliding												●	●	2	2		●	●	●	●	2					6
Pencak silat															●	●	●	●	8		8					16
Roller sports	Roller skating																						2			6
Roller sports	Skateboarding																			●	4					6
Rowing											●	●	●	●	8	7										15
Rugby sevens																						●	●	2		2
Sailing																●	●	●		●	●		10			10
Sambo																							2	2		4
Sepak takraw											●	●	●	2	●	●	1	●	●	1	●	●	●	2		6
Shooting											2	4	3	2	2	3	2	2								20
Soft tennis																				●	2	1	●	2		5
Sport climbing															2	●	●	2	2							6
Squash															●	●	●	2	●	●	●	●	●	2		4
Table tennis																		●	●	2	●	1	●	2		5
Taekwondo											4	3	3	2	2											14
Tennis											●	●	●	●	●	2	3									5
Triathlon																							1	1	1	3
Volleyball	Beach volleyball										●	●	●	●	●	●	●	●	1	1						4
Volleyball	Indoor volleyball										●	●	●	●	●	●	●	●	●	●	●	●	●	2		4
Weightlifting												2	2	1	2	2	2	2	2							15
Wrestling											5	5	4	4												18
Wushu											1	2	3	2	6											14
Daily medal events											21	29	28	33	42	37	26	36	39	29	36	34	30	44	1	465
Cumulative Total											21	50	78	111	153	190	216	252	291	320	356	390	420	464	465	465
Canoe polo (demonstration)																				●	●	2				2
eSports (demonstration)																		1	1	●	1	1	1	1		6
August/September		10th Fri	11th Sat	12th Sun	13th Mon	14th Tue	15th Wed	16th Thu	17th Fri	18th Sat	19th Sun	20th Mon	21st Tue	22nd Wed	23rd Thu	24th Fri	25th Sat	26th Sun	27th Mon	28th Tue	29th Wed	30th Thu	31st Fri	1st Sat	2nd Sun	Events

=== Closing ceremony ===
The closing ceremony started at 19:00 Western Indonesia Time (UTC+7) on Sunday, 2 September 2018 and ended at 21:25. In addition to local artists and a Chinese segment, the South Korean boybands Super Junior and iKon, and Indian singer Sidharth Slathia performed in the ceremony. Mayor of Hangzhou Xu Liyi received the Games flag for the 2022 Games from Jakarta Governor Anies Baswedan and South Sumatra Governor Alex Noerdin.

== Medal table ==
China led the medal table for the tenth consecutive time. Korea claimed their first gold medal at the Games in the canoeing women's traditional boat race 500 m event. A total of 37 NOCs won at least one medal, 29 NOCs won at least one gold medal and 9 NOCs failed to win any medal at the Games.

The top ten ranked NOCs at these Games are listed below.

* Host nation (Indonesia)

2018 Asian Games medal table
Rank	NOC	Gold	Silver	Bronze	Total
1	China	132	92	65	289
2	Japan	75	56	74	205
3	South Korea	49	58	70	177
4	Indonesia*	31	24	43	98
5	Uzbekistan	20	24	25	69
6	Iran	20	20	22	62
7	Chinese Taipei	17	19	31	67
8	India	16	23	31	70
9	Kazakhstan	15	17	44	76
10	North Korea	12	12	13	37
11–37	Remaining NOCs	79	118	206	403
Totals (37 entries)		466	463	624	1,553

== Broadcasting ==
International Games Broadcast Services (IGBS), a joint venture between Host Broadcast Services (HBS) and IMG Media was appointed by the organiser in July 2017 to serve as the host broadcaster for these Games. Involving 37 live production units, it distributed 2,400 hours of the Games content to its international rights holders. The International Broadcast Centre was constructed in Jakarta Convention Center, with a smaller one constructed at the Palembang cluster.

== Concerns and controversies ==
Before the Games, Indonesian authorities were confident that both host cities would be ready, even though they had only four years to prepare rather than the usual six. Indonesia had stepped in to fill the gap after Vietnam, which had originally been chosen by the Olympic Council of Asia to host the Games in Hanoi, withdrew in 2014, citing concerns about costs. Moreover, work in both host cities was delayed throughout 2015 because government funding was not immediately available.

Various concerns from traffic congestion problems, series of terror attacks, which local police claimed is a pre-Asian Games crackdown on terror suspects and petty street criminals, and already-provoked Indonesian fans at the venue.

Jakarta struggled with air pollution and river pollution problems. River pollution revealed where authorities covered a foul-smelling river near the athletes' village with black nylon mesh over fears it will be an eyesore at the showpiece event. Governor of Jakarta at that time, and the Indonesian Environment and Forestry Ministry quickly relieved the issues by various solutions.

A doping case from a Turkmen wrestler was recorded, which jeopardize the sport's existence for future Games.

== See also ==
- 1962 Asian Games
- 2018 Asian Para Games
- 2018 Winter Olympics

== Notes ==
Preceded by Incheon	Asian Games; Jakarta and Palembang; XVIII Asian Games (2018)	Succeeded by Hangzhou
