= Siti Badriah =

Indonesian singer and dancer (born 1991)

- Also known as: Sibad
- Born: 11 November 1991 (age 34); Bekasi, West Java, Indonesia
- Genres: Dangdut; koplo
- Occupations: Singer; actress; songwriter; dancer
- Instrument: Vocals
- Years active: 2012–present
- Label: Nagaswara
- Website: sibad.id/id

Siti Badriah (born 11 November 1991), also known by her alias Sibad, is an Indonesian singer, songwriter, actress, and dancer. She became internationally well known in 2018 due to the popularity of her song Lagi Syantik, which has since gained over 700 million views on the popular streaming site YouTube.

Siti won "Best Contemporary Dangdut Female Solo Artist" three years in a row at the Indonesian Music Awards in 2017, 2018 and 2019. In 2018, she won the "Best ASEAN Economic Community Song" award at the Look Tung Mahanakorn Awards.

== Career ==
Siti Badriah began singing in her early childhood, beginning in grade 2 in elementary school. Throughout her childhood, she would travel with her father's dangdut orchestra, perform with well-known singers, and participate in various music festivals. Though her desire to become a singer was not her original intention, she has wanted to become a dentist since an early age. In a 2018 interview, Siti admitted that she still wanted to be a dentist and that being a singer was not a priority.

In 2011, she was approached by songwriter Endang Raes to perform the song "Samu Samu Selingkuh". The collaboration spurred their collaborative song "Melanggar Hukum" (Breaking the Law), which was presented to Rahayu Kertawiguna, the founder of the Nagaswara music label. Both songs were released less than a week apart.

On 16 March 2018, Siti released the single "Lagi Syantik". The song was an immediate success, garnering over 160 million views on the streaming site YouTube within the first three months. Due to its success, Siti gained international recognition, causing the single to chart at No. 12 on the international Billboard charts. At the time, Siti and South Korean group Blackpink were the only Asian artists charting on Billboard. The song also became popular in Thailand, where Siti won the "Best ASEAN Economic Community Song" award at the 2018 Look Tung Mahanakorn Awards.

Later that year, she collaborated with RPH & DJ Donall for the songs "Lagi Tamvan" (6 June) and "Sandiwaramu Luar Biasa" (17 October). She collaborated with RPH again in 2019 for the song "Nikah Sama Kamu", which also became a viral success, garnering over 1.4 million views on YouTube since its release.

2020 continued to bring the artist success with the release of her songs "Pipi Mimi" and "Video Call Aku". The release date of "Pipi Mimi" - 13 February - coincided with other NAGASWARA artists, including Baby Sexyola, Fitri Carlina and Bebizy, among others. On the music chart ranking site Popnable, the song peaked at No. 2. "Video Call Aku" failed to garner similar reactions, charting in the top 40.

== Personal life ==
Siti married Krisjiana Baharudin on 25 July 2019 in Siti's hometown of Bekasi, West Java. The couple had a daughter named Xarena Zenata Denallie Baharudin (b. 18 March 2022).

== Discography ==
=== Studio albums ===
- 2014: Satu Sama
- 2014: Satu Sama <VCD version>
- 2018: Lagi Syantik

=== Compilation albums ===
- 2014: Hot Single Dangdut vol.2
- 2014: Hot Single Dangdut vol.3
- 2016: The Best of Dangdut

=== Singles ===
- 2012: Brondong Tua
- 2012: Suamiku Kawin Lagi
- 2014: Satu Sama
- 2014: Andilau
- 2014: Heboh Janger
- 2014: Keenakan
- 2014: Selimut Malam
- 2014: Jakarta Hongkong
- 2014.06.08: Sama Sama Selingkuh feat. Endang Raes
- 2014.06.18: Melanggar Hukum
- 2014.11.09: Bara Bere
- 2015.06.08: Sama Sama
- 2016.08.08: Mama Minta Pulsa
- 2016.05.26: Senandung Cinta
- 2016.05.29: Hilang Semua Janji <OST. Senandung>
- 2017.03.01: Harapan Cinta
- 2017.05.05: Ketemu Mantan
- 2017.08.07: Undangan Mantan
- 2018.01.03: Nasib Orang Miskin
- 2018.01.05: Aku Kudu Kuat feat. RPH <OST. Dendang Cinta Wulan>
- 2018.01.16: Bojoku feat. Mahesa Ofki & Temon #PawangKuota
- 2018.03.16: Lagi Syantik
- 2018.10.17: Harus Rindu Siapa
- 2018.10.17: Sandiwaramu Luar Biasa feat. RPH & DJ Donall
- 2019.03.22: Nikah Sama Kamu feat. RPH
- 2020.02.13: Pipi Mimi
- 2020.07.15: Video Call Aku

=== Songs as featured artist ===
- "Cinta Tak Harus Memilik" (with Siti Badriah)
  Delon / Release Date: 19 January 2017
- "Tobat Maksiat" feat. Siti Badriah
  Zaskia Gotik / Release Date: 24 May 2017
- "Lagi Tamvan" feat. Siti Badriah
  RPH & DJ Donall / Release Date: 6 June 2018

== Awards and nominations ==
Indonesia

Year	Award	Category	Nominated work	Result
2017	Anugerah Musik Indonesia	Best Contemporary Dangdut / Dangdut Duo / Group / Collaboration	Cinta Tak Harus Memiliki	Won
2018	Anugerah Musik Indonesia Anugerah Musik Indonesia Dahsyatnya Awards	Best Contemporary Dangdut Male / Female Solo Artist Best Contemporary Dangdut Song Best Dangdut Song	Lagi Syantik	Won
2019	Anugerah Musik Indonesia	Best Contemporary Dangdut Male / Female Solo Artist	Harus Rindu Siapa	Won
2020	Anugerah Musik Indonesia	Best Electro Dangdut Singer	Pipi Mimi	Won
2020	Kiss Awards 2020	Least Female Dangdut Singer		Nominated

Overseas

Year	Country	Award	Category	Nominated work	Result
2019	Thailand	Look Tung Mahanakorn Awards	Best ASEAN Economic Community Song	Lagi Syantik	Won
