= IKon discography =

iKon discography
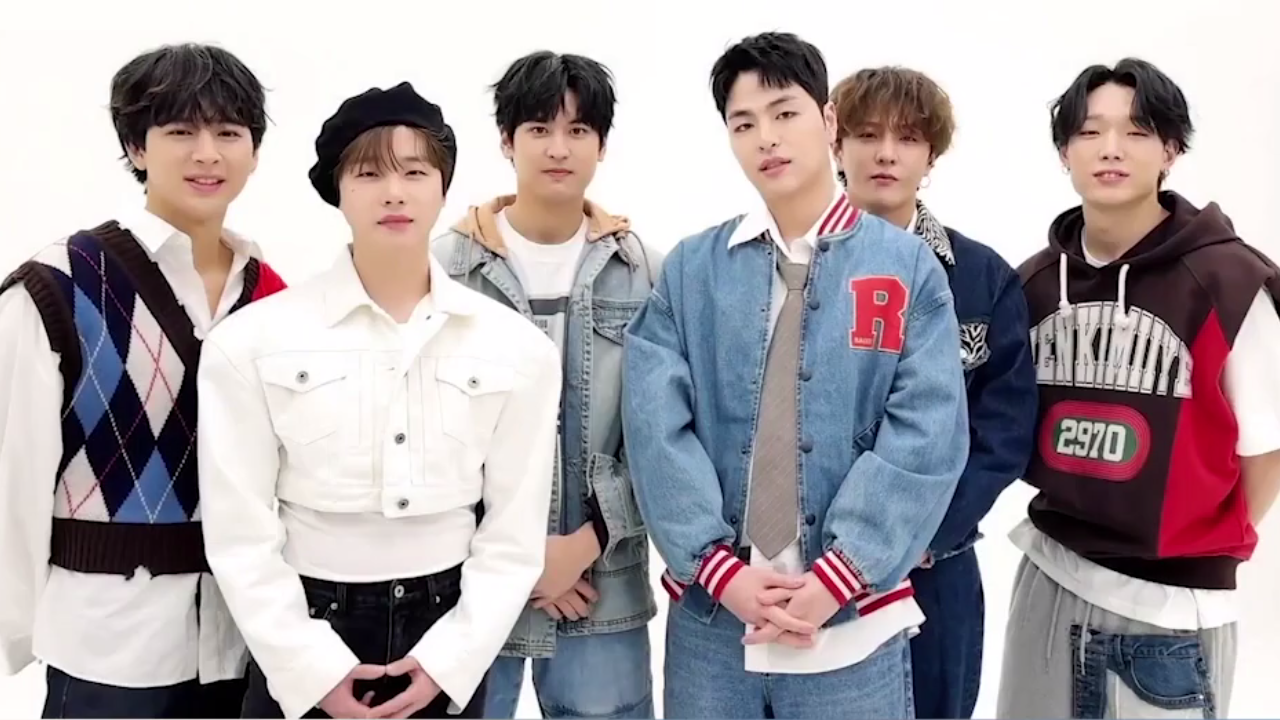
- iKon in 2023
- Studio albums: 5
- EPs: 4
- Live albums: 1
- Compilation albums: 1
- Singles: 18
- Single albums: 1

South Korean boy band iKon released four studio albums, four extended plays, one compilation album, one live album, one single album and eighteen singles.

== Albums ==
=== Studio albums ===
List of studio albums, with selected details, chart positions and sales
Title	Album details	Peak chart positions					Sales
Title	Album details	KOR	FRA	JPN Oricon	JPN Hot	US World	Sales
Korean
Welcome Back	Released: October 1, 2015 (Note: Half album released); Label: YG Entertainment; Formats: CD, digital download	1	—	22	—	3	KOR: 159,747; JPN: 101,384; US: 1,000
Welcome Back	Released: December 24, 2015 (Note: Full album released); Label: YG Entertainment, YGEX; Formats: CD, DVD, digital download	1	—	3	—	2	KOR: 159,747; JPN: 101,384; US: 1,000
Return	Released: January 25, 2018; Label: YG Entertainment, YGEX; Formats: CD, digital download	2	117	1	23	4	KOR: 107,621; JPN: 81,988 (Note: Japan sales figures for Return.); US: 1,000
Take Off	Released: May 4, 2023; Label: 143 Entertainment; Formats: CD, digital download	4	—	—	—	—	KOR: 122,904
Japanese
New Kids	Released: February 27, 2019; Label: YGEX; Formats: CD, digital download	—	—	5	7	—	JPN: 27,169
Flashback [+ I Decide]	Released: July 7, 2022; Label: YGEX; Formats: CD, digital download	—	—	7	5	—	JPN: 11,542
"—" denotes releases that did not chart or were not released in that region.

=== Compilation albums ===
List of compilation albums, with selected chart positions and sales
Title	Album details	Peak positions		Sales
Title	Album details	KOR	JPN	Sales
iKon Single Collection	Released: December 28, 2016 (JPN); Label: YGEX; Format: Digital download	—	—	
The New Kids	Released: January 7, 2019; Label: YG Entertainment; Formats: CD, digital download	1	30	KOR: 68,728; JPN: 2,280

=== Live albums ===
Title	Album details	Peak chart positions		Sales
Title	Album details	KOR	JPN	Sales
2016 iKon – iKoncert Showtime Tour in Seoul Live CD	Released: May 4, 2016; Label: YG Entertainment; Formats: CD, digital download	3	104	KOR: 8,772; JPN: 937

=== Single albums ===
List of single albums, with selected details, chart positions and sales
Title	Album details	Peak positions		Sales
Title	Album details	KOR	JPN	Sales
New Kids: Begin	Released: May 22, 2017; Label: YG Entertainment, YGEX; Formats: CD, digital download	2	1	KOR: 70,949; JPN: 43,082

== Extended plays ==
List of extended plays, with selected chart positions and sales
Title	EP details	Peak positions					Sales
Title	EP details	KOR	FRA Dig.	JPN Oricon	JPN Hot	US World	Sales
New Kids: Continue	Released: August 2, 2018; Label: YG Entertainment; Formats: CD, digital download	2	60	25	22	4	KOR: 109,481; JPN: 5,234; US: 1,000
New Kids: The Final	Released: October 1, 2018; Label: YG Entertainment; Formats: CD, digital download	1	61	32	24	5	KOR: 59,484; JPN: 3,275; US: 1,000
I Decide	Released: February 6, 2020; Label: YG Entertainment; Formats: CD, digital download	3	—N/a	15	—	—	KOR: 55,254; JPN: 5,306
Flashback	Released: May 3, 2022; Label: YG Entertainment; Formats: CD, digital download	2	—N/a	10	9	—	KOR: 99,918; JPN: 832

== Singles ==
List of singles, with selected chart positions, showing year released and album name
Title	Year	Peak chart positions					Sales (Note: Gaon Chart no longer releases download sales figures from January 2018 onwards.) (Note: Korean-language singles are digital downloads while Japanese-language singles are physical units, except noted.)	Certifications (Note: In April 2018, Gaon Chart introduced music recording certifications for albums, downloads and streamings.)	Album
Title	Year	KOR Circle	KOR Hot	JPN Oricon	JPN Hot	US World	Sales	Certifications	Album
Pre-debut (Team B)
"Just Another Boy"	2013	46	*	—	—	—	KOR: 42,985	—N/a	Non-album singles
"Climax"	2013	12	*	—	—	19	KOR: 98,775	—N/a	Non-album singles
"Wait for Me" (기다려)	2014	48	*	—	—	22	KOR: 95,372	—N/a	Non-album singles
Post-debut
Korean
"My Type" (취향저격)	2015	1	*	—	—	3	KOR: 1,631,503	—N/a	Welcome Back
"Rhythm Ta" (리듬 타)	2015	8	*	—	—	11	KOR: 714,377	—N/a	Welcome Back
"Airplane"	2015	13	*	—	—	21	KOR: 392,878	—N/a	Welcome Back
"Anthem" (B.I & Bobby)	2015	6	*	—	—	4	KOR: 202,061	—N/a	Welcome Back
"Apology" (지못미)	2015	1	*	—	—	4	KOR: 600,068	—N/a	Welcome Back
"What's Wrong?" (왜 또)	2015	17	*	—	—	14	KOR: 184,477	—N/a	Welcome Back
"Dumb & Dumber" (덤앤더머)	2015	12	*	—	—	7	KOR: 444,032	—N/a	Welcome Back
"#WYD" (오늘 모해)	2016	3	*	—	—	6	KOR: 366,838	—N/a	Non-album single
"Bling Bling"	2017	24	14	—	33	5	KOR: 57,704	—N/a	New Kids: Begin
"B-Day" (벌떼)	2017	36	13	—	54	10	KOR: 44,433	—N/a	New Kids: Begin
"Love Scenario" (사랑을 했다)	2018	1	1	—	42	4	KOR: 2,500,000; US: 2,000	KMCA: 2× Platinum (Note: Gaon certifications for Love Scenario.)(st.); RIAJ: Gold (st.)	Return
"Rubber Band" (고무줄다리기)	2018	27	27	—	—	10	—N/a	—N/a	The New Kids
"Killing Me" (죽겠다)	2018	9	9	—	61	2	US: 1,000	—N/a	New Kids: Continue
"Freedom" (바람)	2018	— (Note: "Freedom" did not enter the Gaon Digital Chart, but peaked at number 43 on the Download chart.)	—	—	—	—	—N/a	—N/a	New Kids: Continue
"Goodbye Road" (이별길)	2018	2	2	—	—	20	—N/a	—N/a	New Kids: The Final
"I'm OK"	2019	31	25	—	—	2	—N/a	—N/a	The New Kids
"Dive" (뛰어들게)	2020	128	75	—	—	15	—N/a	—N/a	I Decide
"Why Why Why" (왜왜왜)	2021	107	89	—	—	14	—N/a	—N/a	Non-album single
"But You" (너라는 이유)	2022	131	—	—	—	—	—N/a	—N/a	Flashback
"Tantara" (딴따라)	2023	— (Note: "Tantara" did not enter the Gaon Digital Chart, but peaked at number 39 on the Download chart.)	—	—	—	—	—N/a	—N/a	Take Off
"U"	2023	— (Note: "U" did not enter the Gaon Digital Chart, but peaked at number 52 on the Download chart.)	—	—	—	—	—N/a	—N/a	Take Off
"Panorama"	2023	—	—	—	—	—	—N/a	—N/a	Non-album single
Japanese
"Dumb & Dumber"	2016	—	—	1	1	—	JPN: 114,653	RIAJ: Gold	Non-album single
"—" denotes releases that did not chart or were not released in that region. "*" denotes the chart did not exist at that time.

== Other charted songs ==
List of other charted songs, with chart positions and sales
Title	Year	Peak chart positions			Sales	Album
Title	Year	KOR Circle	KOR Hot	US World	Sales	Album
"Today" (오늘따라)	2015	26	*	—	KOR: 148,762	Welcome Back
"Welcome Back"	2015	30	*	—	KOR: 107,320	Welcome Back
"M.U.P" (솔직하게)	2015	34	*	—	KOR: 99,470	Welcome Back
"I Miss You So Bad" (아니라고)	2015	15	*	17	KOR: 193,944	Welcome Back
"Rhythm Ta Remix" (Rock Version)	2015	157	*	—	KOR: 12,788	Welcome Back
"Long Time No See"	2018	52	32	—	—N/a	Return
"Beautiful"	2018	80	52	—	—N/a	Return
"Jerk" (나쁜놈)	2018	85	55	—	—N/a	Return
"Hug Me" (안아보자)	2018	98	62	—	—N/a	Return
"Best Friend"	2018	99	63	—	—N/a	Return
"Don't Forget"	2018	— (Note: "Don't Forget" did not enter the Gaon Digital Chart, but peaked at number 49 on the download chart.)	65	—	—N/a	Return
"Don't Let Me Know" (내가 모르게)	2018	83	99	—	—N/a	New Kids: The Final
"Adore You" (좋아해요)	2018	84	78	—	—N/a	New Kids: The Final
"Perfect" (꼴좋다)	2018	93	100	—	—N/a	New Kids: The Final
"—" denotes releases that did not chart or were not released in that region.

== See also ==
- iKon videography
