= Nagaswara =

Indonesian music company

PT Naga Swarasakti
- Trade name: Nagaswara
- Company type: Private
- Industry: Music; Entertainment
- Genre: Various
- Founded: 9 September 1999; 26 years ago
- Founder: Rahayu Kertawiguna
- Headquarters: Jakarta, Indonesia
- Key people: Rahayu Kertawiguna (Executive producer and president director)
- Website: www.nagaswara.co.id

PT Naga Swarasakti, commonly known as Nagaswara (stylized as NAGASWARA), is an Indonesian music company and headquartered in Jakarta, Indonesia. It was founded in 1999 by Rahayu Kertawiguna and released dance house music in Indonesia from 2000 - 2003. It later combined dangdut with dance music known as dancedhut.

Notable artists include Kerispatih, Wali, The Dance Company, Delon Thamrin, Saint Loco, Siti Badriah, and The Virgin.

== History ==
=== Early years ===
Nagaswara was established in 1999 under the legal name PT Naga Swarasakti by Kertawiguna. When it was first established, Nagaswara only produced karaoke and dance/house music. The label released dance music from 2000 through 2003. In 2003, Nagaswara partnered with multinational labels from Europe and holds the main license of their artists to release in the Indonesian market.

In September 2004, Nagaswara produced and released the compilation album titled Gulalikustik, in collaboration with radio station Mustang 88.0 FM. It introduced the artists Kerispatih, Plus Minus, After, and Gemala. The following year, Nagaswara offered a recording deal to Kerispatih and the band released their debut album Kejujuran Hati.

=== Subsequent years ===
Nagaswara signed Wali, Delon Thamrin, T2, The Dance Company, Hello, Merpati and Zivilia.

Nagaswara focuses on releasing dancedhut music for artists such as Siti Badriah, Denias Ismail and Fitri Carlina.

On January 31, 2018, Kertawiguna's birthday, Nagaswara partnered with Warner Chappell Music as their sub-publisher—Nagaswara handles the publishing of WCM music in Indonesia.

== Nagaswara Music Awards ==
The Nagaswara Music Awards (NMA) is an annual music awards ceremony held by Nagaswara to give appreciation for its artists. The first NMA was held on December 6 - 7, 2010 at Istora Gelora Bung Karno. Artists that performed at the ceremony included Wali, Kerispatih, Ruth Sahanaya, Hello, Mahadewi, The Virgin, and Zivilia, with support from Magenta Orchestra group led by Andi Rianto. The first NMA aired by ANTV on December 18, 2010.

The second NMA was held December 1-3, 2011 at the Jakarta Convention Center and aired live on Global TV.

The third NMA was held on December 9, 2012 at the Hong Kong Convention and Exhibition Centre and supported by SmarTone.

== See also ==
- Lists of record labels
