= Energy of Asia: Official Album of Asian Games 2018 =

Compilation album by Various artists
- Released: 13 July 2018
- Recorded: February 2017 – June 2018
- Genres: Eurodance; pop; EDM; hip hop; pop rock; dangdut
- Length: 48:00
- Languages: Indonesian; English
- Labels: INASGOC; ASIRI; Jagonya Musik & Sport
- Producer: Abdee Negara

Asian Games chronology
17th Asian Games Incheon 2014 Official Album (2014)	Energy of Asia: Official Album of Asian Games 2018 (2018)

Energy of Asia: Official Album of Asian Games 2018 is an official music album for the 2018 Asian Games by Indonesian musical artists, released on 13 July 2018 by the Indonesia Asian Games Organizing Committee (INASGOC), Recording Industry Association of Indonesia (ASIRI), and record label Jagonya Musik & Sport. The album was produced by Abdee Negara of Slank, involves several cross-genre musical artists that some of them collaborate. The album consists of 13 songs, available for purchase at KFC fast-food outlets in Indonesia and for streaming on YouTube and Spotify.

== Background ==
INASGOC took some famous Indonesian musicians and singers to enliven the 2018 Asian Games which were held in Jakarta and Palembang on 18 August to 2 September 2018. According to the INASGOC organizing committee chairman Erick Thohir, in addition to encouraging the athletes, the involvement of artists and musicians was also used to promote Indonesian music to the world. For the Asian Games, they took themes such as solidarity, sportsmanship, victory, struggle, spirit, unity, friendship, and become champion. INASGOC then partnered with ASIRI since it is the trust for recording industry in Indonesia. ASIRI searched for musicians, artists, and songwriters for the album; the tracks then listened and reviewed by INASGOC. The selection of songs was also based on ASIRI's recommendations and research. The basis of assessment was taken from the market of each musician. After those various processes, they finally chose 13 songs representing various genres to be included in the Asian Games compilation album.

== Composition and lyrics ==
INASGOC committee contacted d'Masiv vocalist Rian to create two songs for the Asian Games album. One of them, titled "Bright as the Sun" was sung by 18 Indonesian musicians, tells about the differences in Indonesia that can be an example for other countries and to appreciate the differences. He created it on four days before the one year countdown of the Games on 18 August 2017. The instrumental version of the song was used as background music for the games' International Games Broadcast Services (IGBS) title sequence. Another song, "Menaklukkan Dunia", tells about the spirit and to not easily despair to reach the victory, sung by Indonesian rock singer Once and a contestant of The Voice Kids Indonesia Season 1 Shakira Jasmine.

Indonesian rapper JFlow also provided two songs for the 2018 Asian Games, titled "Unbeatable" and "Dance Tonight". "Unbeatable" was sung by him alongside Dira Sugandi, featuring a musical arrangement of hip hop and pop genres, tells to rekindle the fighting spirit to the end. His other song with Bunga Citra Lestari, "Dance Tonight", is dedicated specifically for female athletes.

The second song of the album, "Janger Persahabatan", was written by Guruh Sukarnoputra and sung by Noah vocalist Ariel and Hivi! former vocalist Dea. Taken from Balinese dance Janger, the song is expected to strengthen the friendship of Indonesia with other countries. The song used both Indonesian and English lyrics but retains ethnic elements that are capable of showing Indonesia's rich cultural identity. The ethnic element becomes a challenge for NEV+, a band which is responsible for the song arrangement. Keyboardist Randy said that they needs help from several parties to create the music, one of them is Vicky Sianipar. They later worked together to presents the rhythm of the spirit, contemporary music, and the thick ethnic nuance.

Indonesian rock band Slank collaborated with DJ Dipha Barus bring the spirit of unity and peace through their dance-pop song "(Non Political) Asian Dance". The song invites people to unite and support Asian Games which will be held in next August and put aside various differences. "So we made the song Asian Dance, because by dancing, people can forget everything," said Slank drummer Bimbim.

A pop dangdut song of the album, "Meraih Bintang", was chosen as the theme song for the 2018 Asian Games. It was written by Pay and sung by popular dangdut singer Via Vallen. Using full of Indonesian lyrics, it breathes the spirit of victory in a sportive way in which an athlete must make their best effort to achieve the best performance.

Drive former vocalist Anji alongside Ade Govinda create the eleventh track of the album titled "Indonesia Berpesta". According to Anji, it tells that Indonesia as the host of the Asian Games must be great, unite the spirit and unite the determination. At the same day, on 12 July 2018, INASGOC released the next Asian Games song titled "Bukan Anak Kemarin Sore". It was created and performed by Indonesian band from Palembang, Armada. It was made "to prove to the world, everyone can be the best. It is a song to encourage as well," added Armada vocalist Rizal.

== Track listing ==
Energy of Asia: Official Album of Asian Games 2018
No.	Title	Lyrics	Music	Performer(s)	Length
1.	"Meraih Bintang" (Reach for The Stars)	Pay; Rastamanis	Pay; Rastamanis	Via Vallen	3:09
2.	"Menaklukkan Dunia" (Conquering the World)	Rian of D'Masiv	Rian of D'Masiv	Once; Shakira Jasmine	3:31
3.	"Janger Persahabatan" (Janger of Friendship)	Guruh Sukarnoputra	Guruh Sukarnoputra; NEV+; Vicky Sianipar	NEV+; Ariel of Noah; Dea	3:58
4.	"Dance Tonight"	JFlow; A. Monteya	JFlow	Bunga Citra Lestari; JFlow	4:06
5.	"Kemenangan" (Victory)	Ade of Govinda; Anji	Ade of Govinda; Anji	Cakra Khan	4:04
6.	"Indonesia Berpesta" (Indonesia's Partying)	Anji	Ade of Govinda	Anji	3:04
7.	"(Non Political) Asian Dance"	Bimbim, Kaka, Ridho, Ivanka of Slank	Bimbim, Kaka, Ridho, Ivanka of Slank	Slank; Dipha Barus	3:23
8.	"Unbeatable"	JFlow; Cindy Bernadette	JFlow	JFlow; Dira Sugandi	3:42
9.	"Cita Kita" (Our Goal)	GAC	GAC	GAC	3:55
10.	"Bukan Anak Kemarin Sore" (Not A Green as Grass Boy)	Rizal, Mai, Radha of Armada	Armada	Armada	3:41
11.	"Be Alright"	Afgan; Simhala Avadan; Tatsuro Miller	Afgan	Afgan	3:31
12.	"Asia’s Who We Are"	Isyana Sarasvati	Isyana Sarasvati	Isyana Sarasvati	3:16
13.	"Bright As The Sun"	Rian, Rama of D'Masiv; Nino of RAN; Irfan of Samsons; Ade of Govinda	Rian, Rama of D'Masiv	Energy18 (Note: Consists of 18 Indonesian musicians: Ariel of Noah, Rian of D'Masiv, Iman of J-Rocks, Tantri of Kotak, Cita Citata, Anji, Rizal of Armada, Cakra Khan, Sheryl Sheinafia, Once, GAC, Ikke Nurjanah, Naga of Lyla, Rossa, Virzha, Pia of Utopia, Afgan, and Delon.)	4:40
Total length:					48:00

== Release history ==
Country	Date	Format
Indonesia	13 July 2018	Digital download
Indonesia	19 July 2018	CD
