= Via Vallen =

Indonesian singer

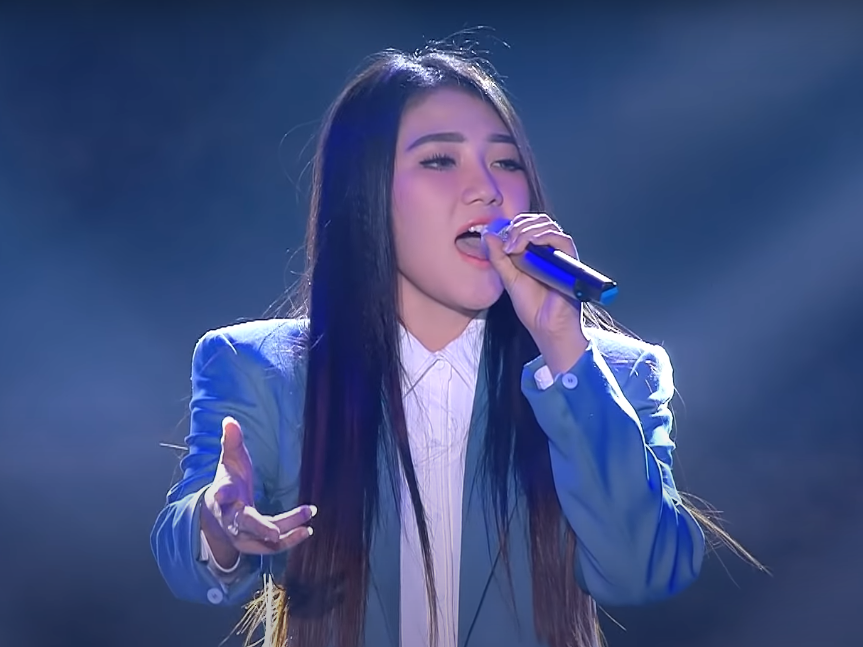
- Via at Indonesian Choice Awards in 2018
- Born: Maulidia Octavia; 1 October 1991 (age 34); Surabaya, East Java, Indonesia
- Occupations: Singer; actress
- Years active: 2006–present
- Musical career
- Genres: Dangdut; koplo; pop
- Instrument: Vocals
- Label: Ascada Musik Indonesia
- Formerly of: Sera

Maulidia Octavia (born 1 October 1991), known professionally as Via Vallen, is an Indonesian dangdut singer. Her stage name, "Vallen", is taken from Evanescence's first album Fallen.

Via started a career in singing at the age of 15. Her presence in the Indonesian show business is often considered similar to that of Isyana Sarasvati because of the resemblance of her face. Via has a support group of fans from different cities named Vyanisty, inaugurated on 24 September 2010. Her solo career began with the release of her first single, "Selingkuh" in early 2015. Her single "Sayang" is her most popular song, having reached more than 100 million views on YouTube, making it the second most viewed Indonesian music video of 2017. Via is also a dangdut singer who sang the theme song for the 2018 Asian Games, "Meraih Bintang" (lit. "Reach for The Stars").

== Background ==
Via Vallen is a dangdut singer from East Java who has been known as a national artist. Via is also successful in bringing the genre of koplo and earned the nickname "Pop Queen Koplo" because the pop songs are sung in the rhythm of dangdut koplo along with a number of famous dangdut music groups such as New Pallapa, SERA, Monata and others. Her work became more widely known when a number of national television stations invited her to become a guest star on the Inbox SCTV Carnival.

Via has been invited to the 2016 Anugerah Dangdut Indonesia MNCTV award ceremony, and has performed with a number of famous artists such as Dewi Persik, Zaskia Gotik, Raffi Ahmad, Soimah Pancawati and others.

In addition to having fans named Vyanisty, Via Vallen is herself a fan of Beyonce and Mariah Carey. Via claimed not to love dangdut as a teenager, preferring pop rock music, including that by the American rock band Evanescence, and singer Avril Lavigne.

Her stage name Vallen is taken from the first album Evanescence titled Fallen. Via Vallen joined Sera, an Indonesian dangdut band, in 2008. She appeared in televised concerts in Hong Kong and China in 2016.

Via's maternal family are from Bandung and Aceh. Via started her career in entertainment in the second grade of junior high school. Since the 5th grade, she attended gigs as a trainee singer with her father, who is himself a dangdut musician.

Via released her first single entitled "Selingkuh" in 2015. Next, she issued singles such as "Secawan Madu", "Sayang", "Sakit Sakit Hatiku", "Baper", "Peternak Luka", and many more, and her first album titled The Names was released in 2016.

Via Vallen won the 2017 SCTV Music Awards Most Popular Dangdut Singer category, winning this award against competition from a number of famous dangdut singers. Via also received the Most Popular Female Dangdut Singer in Indonesian Dangdut Award (IDA) 2017 and also get award from DWP (Dangdut Wilayah Pantura) for Best Singer ter-WP.

In 2018, she performed the 2018 Asian Games official theme song "Meraih Bintang", a pop dangdut song written by Parlin Burman "Pay" Siburian. On 6 July 2018, it was announced that she will perform alongside 107 bands from 30 countries at the International Indie Music Festival at Indonesia Convention Exhibition. The event was held from 27 September to 7 October 2018.

== Style ==
Via does not seek to imitate the style of traditional dangdut singers; instead, it aims at a fresher, younger, and more modern style, a shared characteristic of Korean women or the Japanese Harajuku style.

== Personal life ==
Via Vallen has been harassed by a famous footballer based in Indonesia via an Instagram direct message. She shared her harassment conversation with the footballer on Instagram and told him to stay away from her. She did not disclose the account that harassed her, but some reports and evidences said that the account belonged to Persija player Marko Šimić. She is a fan of the Premier League club Manchester United.

== Discography ==
=== Studio albums ===
Title	Album details	Sales	Certifications
The Names	Released: 2016; Label: Unknown; Format: CD	—N/a	—N/a
Sayang	Released: 18 January 2018; Label: Ascada Musik; Formats: CD, digital download	150,000+	ASIRI: Platinum

=== Compilation albums ===
Title	Album details
Best Via Vallen	Released: 15 November 2016; Label: Samudra Record; Format: Digital download
Best Cover Collection	Released: 2 January 2017; Label: Markoplo Records; Format: Digital download

=== Singles ===
Title	Year	Album	Label
"Selimut Rindu"	2016	Unknown	Samudra Record
"Kimcil Kepolen" (Koplo)	2016	Unknown	Samudra Record
"Bilang I Love You"	2016	Best Via Vallen	Samudra Record
"Kanggo Riko" (Koplo)	2016	Best Via Vallen	Samudra Record
"Sitik sitik" (Koplo)	2016	Best Via Vallen	Samudra Record
"Kuingin Kau Mati Saja"	2016	Best Via Vallen	Samudra Record
"Lele Diwedangi" (Koplo)	2016	Best Via Vallen	Samudra Record
"Lungset" (Koplo) (featuring Mahesa)	2016	Best Via Vallen	Samudra Record
"Satu Cinta"	2016	Best Via Vallen	Samudra Record
"Cintai Aku Selamanya"	2016	Best Via Vallen	Samudra Record
"Sayang" (Koplo)	2017	Sayang	Ascada Musik Indonesia
"Sakit Sakit Hatiku"	2017	Sayang	Ascada Musik Indonesia
"Secawan Madu"	2017	Sayang	Ascada Musik Indonesia
"Selingkuh"	2017	Sayang	Ascada Musik Indonesia
"5 Centi"	2017	Sayang	Ascada Musik Indonesia
"Cinta Kurang Gizi"	2017	Sayang	Ascada Musik Indonesia
"Baper"	2017	Sayang	Ascada Musik Indonesia
"Makan Diluar"	2017	Sayang	Ascada Musik Indonesia
"Lepas Tanpa Kata"	2017	Sayang	Ascada Musik Indonesia
"Warna Cinta"	2017	Sayang	Ascada Musik Indonesia
"Tak Bisa Memiliki"	2017	Unknown	Samudra Record
"Pak Polisi"	2018	Non-album singles	Ascada Musik Indonesia
"Bojo Galak" (Koplo)	2018	Non-album singles	Ascada Musik Indonesia
"Jerit Atiku" (Koplo)	2018	Non-album singles	Ascada Musik Indonesia
"Meraih Bintang"	2018	Asian Games 2018: Energy of Asia	Ascada Musik Indonesia
"Kita Bisa" (Lead the Way Indonesian version)	2021	Raya and the Last Dragon	Walt Disney Records

== Awards and nominations ==
Year	Category	Award	Result
2017	The Most Popular Dangdut Singer	SCTV Music Awards 2017	Won
2017	Popular Female Solo Dangdut Singer	Indonesian Dangdut Awards 2017	Won
2017	The Most Popular Singer	SCTV Awards 2017	Won
2017	Dangdut Singer Tersocmed	MNCTV Anugerah Dangdut Indonesia 2017	Won
2017	Fanbase Tersocmed	MNCTV Anugerah Dangdut Indonesia 2017	Won
2017	Most Joss Dangdut Singer	MNCTV Anugerah Dangdut Indonesia 2017	Won
2017	Dangdut Singer Ter-WP	DWP (Dangdut Wilayah Pantura) 2017	Won
2018	The Most Popular Dangdut Singer	SCTV Music Awards 2018	Won
2018	Female Dangdut Singer	Social Media Award 2018	Won
2018	Favorite Musician	Insert 2018	Won
2018	The Most Popular Female Dangdut Singer	Indonesian Dangdut Awards 2018	Won
2018	Anugerah Dangdut Indonesia 2018	Won	The Most Style Dangdut Singer
2019		BraVo Awards 2019 in Russia	Won
